

307001–307100 

|-bgcolor=#d6d6d6
| 307001 ||  || — || November 20, 2001 || Socorro || LINEAR || EOS || align=right | 2.6 km || 
|-id=002 bgcolor=#E9E9E9
| 307002 ||  || — || November 21, 2001 || Socorro || LINEAR || — || align=right | 3.9 km || 
|-id=003 bgcolor=#E9E9E9
| 307003 ||  || — || November 16, 2001 || Kvistaberg || UDAS || — || align=right | 1.6 km || 
|-id=004 bgcolor=#E9E9E9
| 307004 ||  || — || November 16, 2001 || Kitt Peak || Spacewatch || — || align=right | 1.3 km || 
|-id=005 bgcolor=#FFC2E0
| 307005 ||  || — || December 8, 2001 || Socorro || LINEAR || APO +1kmPHAcritical || align=right data-sort-value="0.89" | 890 m || 
|-id=006 bgcolor=#FA8072
| 307006 ||  || — || December 8, 2001 || Socorro || LINEAR || — || align=right | 4.5 km || 
|-id=007 bgcolor=#E9E9E9
| 307007 ||  || — || December 10, 2001 || Nashville || R. Clingan || — || align=right | 1.4 km || 
|-id=008 bgcolor=#d6d6d6
| 307008 ||  || — || December 9, 2001 || Socorro || LINEAR || — || align=right | 3.5 km || 
|-id=009 bgcolor=#FA8072
| 307009 ||  || — || December 9, 2001 || Socorro || LINEAR || — || align=right | 2.0 km || 
|-id=010 bgcolor=#E9E9E9
| 307010 ||  || — || December 9, 2001 || Socorro || LINEAR || — || align=right | 2.4 km || 
|-id=011 bgcolor=#E9E9E9
| 307011 ||  || — || December 10, 2001 || Socorro || LINEAR || — || align=right | 1.4 km || 
|-id=012 bgcolor=#E9E9E9
| 307012 ||  || — || December 10, 2001 || Socorro || LINEAR || — || align=right | 2.9 km || 
|-id=013 bgcolor=#fefefe
| 307013 ||  || — || December 10, 2001 || Socorro || LINEAR || — || align=right | 1.2 km || 
|-id=014 bgcolor=#E9E9E9
| 307014 ||  || — || December 10, 2001 || Socorro || LINEAR || — || align=right | 2.0 km || 
|-id=015 bgcolor=#E9E9E9
| 307015 ||  || — || December 10, 2001 || Socorro || LINEAR || — || align=right | 2.2 km || 
|-id=016 bgcolor=#E9E9E9
| 307016 ||  || — || December 11, 2001 || Socorro || LINEAR || — || align=right | 1.5 km || 
|-id=017 bgcolor=#E9E9E9
| 307017 ||  || — || December 11, 2001 || Socorro || LINEAR || — || align=right | 1.6 km || 
|-id=018 bgcolor=#E9E9E9
| 307018 ||  || — || December 11, 2001 || Socorro || LINEAR || — || align=right | 1.4 km || 
|-id=019 bgcolor=#E9E9E9
| 307019 ||  || — || December 11, 2001 || Socorro || LINEAR || — || align=right | 1.2 km || 
|-id=020 bgcolor=#d6d6d6
| 307020 ||  || — || December 11, 2001 || Socorro || LINEAR || EOS || align=right | 2.3 km || 
|-id=021 bgcolor=#fefefe
| 307021 ||  || — || December 11, 2001 || Socorro || LINEAR || — || align=right | 1.0 km || 
|-id=022 bgcolor=#fefefe
| 307022 ||  || — || December 10, 2001 || Socorro || LINEAR || — || align=right | 1.1 km || 
|-id=023 bgcolor=#fefefe
| 307023 ||  || — || December 10, 2001 || Socorro || LINEAR || — || align=right data-sort-value="0.80" | 800 m || 
|-id=024 bgcolor=#fefefe
| 307024 ||  || — || December 10, 2001 || Socorro || LINEAR || — || align=right data-sort-value="0.92" | 920 m || 
|-id=025 bgcolor=#E9E9E9
| 307025 ||  || — || December 11, 2001 || Socorro || LINEAR || — || align=right | 2.1 km || 
|-id=026 bgcolor=#E9E9E9
| 307026 ||  || — || December 14, 2001 || Socorro || LINEAR || — || align=right | 1.5 km || 
|-id=027 bgcolor=#fefefe
| 307027 ||  || — || December 14, 2001 || Socorro || LINEAR || FLO || align=right data-sort-value="0.67" | 670 m || 
|-id=028 bgcolor=#d6d6d6
| 307028 ||  || — || December 14, 2001 || Socorro || LINEAR || EOS || align=right | 2.7 km || 
|-id=029 bgcolor=#E9E9E9
| 307029 ||  || — || December 14, 2001 || Socorro || LINEAR || GER || align=right | 2.0 km || 
|-id=030 bgcolor=#d6d6d6
| 307030 ||  || — || December 14, 2001 || Socorro || LINEAR || EOS || align=right | 2.2 km || 
|-id=031 bgcolor=#d6d6d6
| 307031 ||  || — || December 14, 2001 || Socorro || LINEAR || TRP || align=right | 5.1 km || 
|-id=032 bgcolor=#fefefe
| 307032 ||  || — || December 14, 2001 || Socorro || LINEAR || FLO || align=right data-sort-value="0.96" | 960 m || 
|-id=033 bgcolor=#fefefe
| 307033 ||  || — || December 14, 2001 || Socorro || LINEAR || FLO || align=right data-sort-value="0.81" | 810 m || 
|-id=034 bgcolor=#d6d6d6
| 307034 ||  || — || December 14, 2001 || Socorro || LINEAR || LAU || align=right | 1.6 km || 
|-id=035 bgcolor=#d6d6d6
| 307035 ||  || — || December 11, 2001 || Socorro || LINEAR || LAU || align=right | 1.2 km || 
|-id=036 bgcolor=#E9E9E9
| 307036 ||  || — || December 13, 2001 || Socorro || LINEAR || — || align=right | 3.3 km || 
|-id=037 bgcolor=#E9E9E9
| 307037 ||  || — || December 15, 2001 || Socorro || LINEAR || — || align=right | 2.1 km || 
|-id=038 bgcolor=#E9E9E9
| 307038 ||  || — || December 15, 2001 || Socorro || LINEAR || RAF || align=right | 1.2 km || 
|-id=039 bgcolor=#fefefe
| 307039 ||  || — || December 15, 2001 || Socorro || LINEAR || MAS || align=right data-sort-value="0.90" | 900 m || 
|-id=040 bgcolor=#E9E9E9
| 307040 ||  || — || December 15, 2001 || Socorro || LINEAR || — || align=right | 2.6 km || 
|-id=041 bgcolor=#fefefe
| 307041 ||  || — || December 14, 2001 || Socorro || LINEAR || NYS || align=right data-sort-value="0.74" | 740 m || 
|-id=042 bgcolor=#d6d6d6
| 307042 ||  || — || December 14, 2001 || Socorro || LINEAR || — || align=right | 1.8 km || 
|-id=043 bgcolor=#E9E9E9
| 307043 ||  || — || December 14, 2001 || Socorro || LINEAR || — || align=right | 2.7 km || 
|-id=044 bgcolor=#fefefe
| 307044 ||  || — || December 14, 2001 || Socorro || LINEAR || — || align=right | 1.5 km || 
|-id=045 bgcolor=#fefefe
| 307045 ||  || — || December 15, 2001 || Socorro || LINEAR || — || align=right | 1.2 km || 
|-id=046 bgcolor=#fefefe
| 307046 ||  || — || December 23, 2001 || Kingsnake || J. V. McClusky || — || align=right data-sort-value="0.83" | 830 m || 
|-id=047 bgcolor=#fefefe
| 307047 ||  || — || December 18, 2001 || Socorro || LINEAR || — || align=right | 3.0 km || 
|-id=048 bgcolor=#fefefe
| 307048 ||  || — || December 18, 2001 || Socorro || LINEAR || NYS || align=right | 1.1 km || 
|-id=049 bgcolor=#d6d6d6
| 307049 ||  || — || December 18, 2001 || Socorro || LINEAR || — || align=right | 2.8 km || 
|-id=050 bgcolor=#E9E9E9
| 307050 ||  || — || December 18, 2001 || Socorro || LINEAR || JUN || align=right | 1.3 km || 
|-id=051 bgcolor=#fefefe
| 307051 ||  || — || December 18, 2001 || Socorro || LINEAR || — || align=right | 1.1 km || 
|-id=052 bgcolor=#fefefe
| 307052 ||  || — || December 18, 2001 || Socorro || LINEAR || FLO || align=right data-sort-value="0.66" | 660 m || 
|-id=053 bgcolor=#E9E9E9
| 307053 ||  || — || December 18, 2001 || Socorro || LINEAR || — || align=right | 1.5 km || 
|-id=054 bgcolor=#E9E9E9
| 307054 ||  || — || December 18, 2001 || Socorro || LINEAR || — || align=right | 1.3 km || 
|-id=055 bgcolor=#fefefe
| 307055 ||  || — || December 18, 2001 || Socorro || LINEAR || — || align=right | 1.0 km || 
|-id=056 bgcolor=#E9E9E9
| 307056 ||  || — || December 18, 2001 || Socorro || LINEAR || — || align=right | 2.5 km || 
|-id=057 bgcolor=#E9E9E9
| 307057 ||  || — || December 18, 2001 || Socorro || LINEAR || — || align=right | 1.2 km || 
|-id=058 bgcolor=#fefefe
| 307058 ||  || — || December 18, 2001 || Socorro || LINEAR || FLO || align=right data-sort-value="0.87" | 870 m || 
|-id=059 bgcolor=#fefefe
| 307059 ||  || — || December 18, 2001 || Socorro || LINEAR || — || align=right | 1.6 km || 
|-id=060 bgcolor=#E9E9E9
| 307060 ||  || — || December 18, 2001 || Palomar || NEAT || — || align=right | 2.1 km || 
|-id=061 bgcolor=#fefefe
| 307061 ||  || — || December 17, 2001 || Socorro || LINEAR || — || align=right | 1.1 km || 
|-id=062 bgcolor=#E9E9E9
| 307062 ||  || — || December 18, 2001 || Socorro || LINEAR || — || align=right | 1.8 km || 
|-id=063 bgcolor=#E9E9E9
| 307063 ||  || — || January 2, 2002 || Cima Ekar || ADAS || — || align=right | 1.9 km || 
|-id=064 bgcolor=#FA8072
| 307064 ||  || — || January 8, 2002 || Palomar || NEAT || — || align=right data-sort-value="0.98" | 980 m || 
|-id=065 bgcolor=#fefefe
| 307065 ||  || — || January 6, 2002 || Kitt Peak || Spacewatch || — || align=right | 1.3 km || 
|-id=066 bgcolor=#fefefe
| 307066 ||  || — || January 7, 2002 || Kitt Peak || Spacewatch || V || align=right data-sort-value="0.76" | 760 m || 
|-id=067 bgcolor=#FA8072
| 307067 ||  || — || January 11, 2002 || Socorro || LINEAR || — || align=right | 2.7 km || 
|-id=068 bgcolor=#FA8072
| 307068 ||  || — || January 12, 2002 || Socorro || LINEAR || — || align=right data-sort-value="0.71" | 710 m || 
|-id=069 bgcolor=#E9E9E9
| 307069 ||  || — || January 9, 2002 || Socorro || LINEAR || — || align=right | 2.3 km || 
|-id=070 bgcolor=#FFC2E0
| 307070 ||  || — || January 14, 2002 || Socorro || LINEAR || APO || align=right data-sort-value="0.28" | 280 m || 
|-id=071 bgcolor=#fefefe
| 307071 ||  || — || January 11, 2002 || Palomar || NEAT || PHO || align=right | 1.5 km || 
|-id=072 bgcolor=#d6d6d6
| 307072 ||  || — || January 9, 2002 || Kitt Peak || Spacewatch || CHA || align=right | 3.0 km || 
|-id=073 bgcolor=#d6d6d6
| 307073 ||  || — || January 9, 2002 || Socorro || LINEAR || EOS || align=right | 2.5 km || 
|-id=074 bgcolor=#d6d6d6
| 307074 ||  || — || January 9, 2002 || Socorro || LINEAR || EOS || align=right | 2.7 km || 
|-id=075 bgcolor=#E9E9E9
| 307075 ||  || — || January 9, 2002 || Socorro || LINEAR || — || align=right | 1.5 km || 
|-id=076 bgcolor=#d6d6d6
| 307076 ||  || — || January 9, 2002 || Socorro || LINEAR || — || align=right | 4.2 km || 
|-id=077 bgcolor=#fefefe
| 307077 ||  || — || January 9, 2002 || Socorro || LINEAR || — || align=right data-sort-value="0.87" | 870 m || 
|-id=078 bgcolor=#fefefe
| 307078 ||  || — || January 12, 2002 || Kitt Peak || Spacewatch || FLO || align=right data-sort-value="0.74" | 740 m || 
|-id=079 bgcolor=#fefefe
| 307079 ||  || — || January 8, 2002 || Socorro || LINEAR || — || align=right | 1.0 km || 
|-id=080 bgcolor=#d6d6d6
| 307080 ||  || — || January 9, 2002 || Socorro || LINEAR || EOS || align=right | 3.2 km || 
|-id=081 bgcolor=#E9E9E9
| 307081 ||  || — || January 9, 2002 || Socorro || LINEAR || — || align=right | 1.6 km || 
|-id=082 bgcolor=#d6d6d6
| 307082 ||  || — || January 8, 2002 || Socorro || LINEAR || EOS || align=right | 2.7 km || 
|-id=083 bgcolor=#d6d6d6
| 307083 ||  || — || January 8, 2002 || Socorro || LINEAR || — || align=right | 2.9 km || 
|-id=084 bgcolor=#fefefe
| 307084 ||  || — || January 8, 2002 || Socorro || LINEAR || FLO || align=right data-sort-value="0.97" | 970 m || 
|-id=085 bgcolor=#d6d6d6
| 307085 ||  || — || January 9, 2002 || Socorro || LINEAR || — || align=right | 3.6 km || 
|-id=086 bgcolor=#E9E9E9
| 307086 ||  || — || January 9, 2002 || Socorro || LINEAR || — || align=right | 2.1 km || 
|-id=087 bgcolor=#fefefe
| 307087 ||  || — || January 8, 2002 || Socorro || LINEAR || — || align=right data-sort-value="0.69" | 690 m || 
|-id=088 bgcolor=#fefefe
| 307088 ||  || — || January 13, 2002 || Socorro || LINEAR || — || align=right | 1.3 km || 
|-id=089 bgcolor=#d6d6d6
| 307089 ||  || — || January 13, 2002 || Socorro || LINEAR || — || align=right | 3.9 km || 
|-id=090 bgcolor=#E9E9E9
| 307090 ||  || — || January 14, 2002 || Socorro || LINEAR || — || align=right | 1.4 km || 
|-id=091 bgcolor=#fefefe
| 307091 ||  || — || January 14, 2002 || Socorro || LINEAR || — || align=right | 1.4 km || 
|-id=092 bgcolor=#fefefe
| 307092 ||  || — || January 14, 2002 || Socorro || LINEAR || — || align=right | 1.4 km || 
|-id=093 bgcolor=#d6d6d6
| 307093 ||  || — || January 12, 2002 || Kitt Peak || Spacewatch || DUR || align=right | 4.5 km || 
|-id=094 bgcolor=#fefefe
| 307094 ||  || — || January 13, 2002 || Kitt Peak || Spacewatch || NYS || align=right data-sort-value="0.77" | 770 m || 
|-id=095 bgcolor=#E9E9E9
| 307095 ||  || — || January 8, 2002 || Socorro || LINEAR || MAR || align=right | 1.8 km || 
|-id=096 bgcolor=#fefefe
| 307096 ||  || — || January 5, 2002 || Kitt Peak || Spacewatch || fast? || align=right | 1.1 km || 
|-id=097 bgcolor=#FA8072
| 307097 ||  || — || January 19, 2002 || Socorro || LINEAR || H || align=right data-sort-value="0.74" | 740 m || 
|-id=098 bgcolor=#E9E9E9
| 307098 ||  || — || January 23, 2002 || Socorro || LINEAR || EUN || align=right | 2.1 km || 
|-id=099 bgcolor=#E9E9E9
| 307099 ||  || — || January 21, 2002 || Anderson Mesa || LONEOS || — || align=right | 2.0 km || 
|-id=100 bgcolor=#fefefe
| 307100 ||  || — || February 1, 2002 || Socorro || LINEAR || PHO || align=right | 1.2 km || 
|}

307101–307200 

|-bgcolor=#d6d6d6
| 307101 ||  || — || February 8, 2002 || Fountain Hills || C. W. Juels, P. R. Holvorcem || — || align=right | 6.0 km || 
|-id=102 bgcolor=#E9E9E9
| 307102 ||  || — || February 6, 2002 || Socorro || LINEAR || — || align=right | 1.2 km || 
|-id=103 bgcolor=#fefefe
| 307103 ||  || — || February 6, 2002 || Socorro || LINEAR || — || align=right | 1.00 km || 
|-id=104 bgcolor=#fefefe
| 307104 ||  || — || February 7, 2002 || Kitt Peak || Spacewatch || — || align=right data-sort-value="0.84" | 840 m || 
|-id=105 bgcolor=#fefefe
| 307105 ||  || — || February 8, 2002 || Socorro || LINEAR || H || align=right data-sort-value="0.94" | 940 m || 
|-id=106 bgcolor=#E9E9E9
| 307106 ||  || — || February 6, 2002 || Socorro || LINEAR || — || align=right | 1.4 km || 
|-id=107 bgcolor=#d6d6d6
| 307107 ||  || — || February 6, 2002 || Socorro || LINEAR || THB || align=right | 4.2 km || 
|-id=108 bgcolor=#fefefe
| 307108 ||  || — || February 8, 2002 || Kitt Peak || Spacewatch || NYS || align=right data-sort-value="0.81" | 810 m || 
|-id=109 bgcolor=#d6d6d6
| 307109 ||  || — || February 3, 2002 || Haleakala || NEAT || — || align=right | 4.4 km || 
|-id=110 bgcolor=#E9E9E9
| 307110 ||  || — || February 9, 2002 || Kitt Peak || Spacewatch || — || align=right | 1.4 km || 
|-id=111 bgcolor=#fefefe
| 307111 ||  || — || February 6, 2002 || Socorro || LINEAR || — || align=right | 1.7 km || 
|-id=112 bgcolor=#fefefe
| 307112 ||  || — || February 7, 2002 || Socorro || LINEAR || — || align=right data-sort-value="0.89" | 890 m || 
|-id=113 bgcolor=#fefefe
| 307113 ||  || — || February 7, 2002 || Socorro || LINEAR || V || align=right data-sort-value="0.82" | 820 m || 
|-id=114 bgcolor=#d6d6d6
| 307114 ||  || — || February 7, 2002 || Socorro || LINEAR || — || align=right | 4.1 km || 
|-id=115 bgcolor=#E9E9E9
| 307115 ||  || — || February 7, 2002 || Socorro || LINEAR || — || align=right | 1.7 km || 
|-id=116 bgcolor=#fefefe
| 307116 ||  || — || February 7, 2002 || Socorro || LINEAR || — || align=right | 1.1 km || 
|-id=117 bgcolor=#E9E9E9
| 307117 ||  || — || February 7, 2002 || Socorro || LINEAR || — || align=right | 1.1 km || 
|-id=118 bgcolor=#E9E9E9
| 307118 ||  || — || February 7, 2002 || Socorro || LINEAR || — || align=right | 2.1 km || 
|-id=119 bgcolor=#d6d6d6
| 307119 ||  || — || February 7, 2002 || Socorro || LINEAR || — || align=right | 4.1 km || 
|-id=120 bgcolor=#d6d6d6
| 307120 ||  || — || February 7, 2002 || Bohyunsan || Bohyunsan Obs. || — || align=right | 4.2 km || 
|-id=121 bgcolor=#E9E9E9
| 307121 ||  || — || February 7, 2002 || Socorro || LINEAR || — || align=right | 1.9 km || 
|-id=122 bgcolor=#E9E9E9
| 307122 ||  || — || February 7, 2002 || Socorro || LINEAR || — || align=right | 1.4 km || 
|-id=123 bgcolor=#E9E9E9
| 307123 ||  || — || February 7, 2002 || Socorro || LINEAR || MAR || align=right | 1.5 km || 
|-id=124 bgcolor=#d6d6d6
| 307124 ||  || — || February 7, 2002 || Socorro || LINEAR || EOS || align=right | 2.6 km || 
|-id=125 bgcolor=#d6d6d6
| 307125 ||  || — || February 7, 2002 || Socorro || LINEAR || VER || align=right | 4.6 km || 
|-id=126 bgcolor=#fefefe
| 307126 ||  || — || February 9, 2002 || Socorro || LINEAR || — || align=right | 1.3 km || 
|-id=127 bgcolor=#d6d6d6
| 307127 ||  || — || February 10, 2002 || Socorro || LINEAR || THM || align=right | 2.3 km || 
|-id=128 bgcolor=#fefefe
| 307128 ||  || — || February 10, 2002 || Socorro || LINEAR || V || align=right data-sort-value="0.94" | 940 m || 
|-id=129 bgcolor=#d6d6d6
| 307129 ||  || — || February 6, 2002 || Socorro || LINEAR || — || align=right | 4.7 km || 
|-id=130 bgcolor=#fefefe
| 307130 ||  || — || February 7, 2002 || Socorro || LINEAR || FLO || align=right data-sort-value="0.81" | 810 m || 
|-id=131 bgcolor=#d6d6d6
| 307131 ||  || — || February 8, 2002 || Socorro || LINEAR || — || align=right | 3.5 km || 
|-id=132 bgcolor=#d6d6d6
| 307132 ||  || — || February 8, 2002 || Socorro || LINEAR || — || align=right | 3.5 km || 
|-id=133 bgcolor=#d6d6d6
| 307133 ||  || — || February 8, 2002 || Socorro || LINEAR || — || align=right | 3.6 km || 
|-id=134 bgcolor=#d6d6d6
| 307134 ||  || — || February 8, 2002 || Socorro || LINEAR || — || align=right | 5.7 km || 
|-id=135 bgcolor=#fefefe
| 307135 ||  || — || February 8, 2002 || Socorro || LINEAR || — || align=right | 1.2 km || 
|-id=136 bgcolor=#E9E9E9
| 307136 ||  || — || February 8, 2002 || Socorro || LINEAR || — || align=right | 1.5 km || 
|-id=137 bgcolor=#d6d6d6
| 307137 ||  || — || February 10, 2002 || Socorro || LINEAR || — || align=right | 3.1 km || 
|-id=138 bgcolor=#E9E9E9
| 307138 ||  || — || February 10, 2002 || Socorro || LINEAR || — || align=right | 1.9 km || 
|-id=139 bgcolor=#d6d6d6
| 307139 ||  || — || February 10, 2002 || Socorro || LINEAR || — || align=right | 2.4 km || 
|-id=140 bgcolor=#fefefe
| 307140 ||  || — || February 10, 2002 || Socorro || LINEAR || — || align=right data-sort-value="0.66" | 660 m || 
|-id=141 bgcolor=#d6d6d6
| 307141 ||  || — || February 10, 2002 || Socorro || LINEAR || — || align=right | 4.1 km || 
|-id=142 bgcolor=#fefefe
| 307142 ||  || — || February 10, 2002 || Socorro || LINEAR || MAS || align=right data-sort-value="0.76" | 760 m || 
|-id=143 bgcolor=#FA8072
| 307143 ||  || — || February 10, 2002 || Socorro || LINEAR || — || align=right data-sort-value="0.68" | 680 m || 
|-id=144 bgcolor=#fefefe
| 307144 ||  || — || February 6, 2002 || Palomar || NEAT || V || align=right data-sort-value="0.86" | 860 m || 
|-id=145 bgcolor=#d6d6d6
| 307145 ||  || — || February 11, 2002 || Socorro || LINEAR || LAU || align=right | 1.3 km || 
|-id=146 bgcolor=#fefefe
| 307146 ||  || — || February 11, 2002 || Socorro || LINEAR || NYS || align=right data-sort-value="0.91" | 910 m || 
|-id=147 bgcolor=#d6d6d6
| 307147 ||  || — || February 15, 2002 || Socorro || LINEAR || — || align=right | 3.4 km || 
|-id=148 bgcolor=#d6d6d6
| 307148 ||  || — || February 3, 2002 || Anderson Mesa || LONEOS || — || align=right | 3.7 km || 
|-id=149 bgcolor=#fefefe
| 307149 ||  || — || February 6, 2002 || Anderson Mesa || LONEOS || — || align=right | 1.1 km || 
|-id=150 bgcolor=#d6d6d6
| 307150 ||  || — || February 4, 2002 || Palomar || NEAT || EMA || align=right | 4.7 km || 
|-id=151 bgcolor=#d6d6d6
| 307151 ||  || — || February 7, 2002 || Kitt Peak || Spacewatch || — || align=right | 3.3 km || 
|-id=152 bgcolor=#fefefe
| 307152 ||  || — || February 8, 2002 || Kitt Peak || Spacewatch || FLO || align=right data-sort-value="0.66" | 660 m || 
|-id=153 bgcolor=#d6d6d6
| 307153 ||  || — || February 9, 2002 || Kitt Peak || Spacewatch || — || align=right | 3.2 km || 
|-id=154 bgcolor=#d6d6d6
| 307154 ||  || — || February 10, 2002 || Kitt Peak || Spacewatch || — || align=right | 3.1 km || 
|-id=155 bgcolor=#d6d6d6
| 307155 ||  || — || February 11, 2002 || Socorro || LINEAR || — || align=right | 4.1 km || 
|-id=156 bgcolor=#d6d6d6
| 307156 ||  || — || February 9, 2002 || Palomar || NEAT || — || align=right | 3.3 km || 
|-id=157 bgcolor=#fefefe
| 307157 ||  || — || February 12, 2002 || Socorro || LINEAR || — || align=right | 1.3 km || 
|-id=158 bgcolor=#d6d6d6
| 307158 ||  || — || February 12, 2002 || Socorro || LINEAR || — || align=right | 3.4 km || 
|-id=159 bgcolor=#fefefe
| 307159 ||  || — || February 19, 2002 || Socorro || LINEAR || H || align=right data-sort-value="0.65" | 650 m || 
|-id=160 bgcolor=#d6d6d6
| 307160 ||  || — || February 19, 2002 || Socorro || LINEAR || Tj (2.97) || align=right | 10 km || 
|-id=161 bgcolor=#FFC2E0
| 307161 ||  || — || February 25, 2002 || Socorro || LINEAR || AMO || align=right data-sort-value="0.76" | 760 m || 
|-id=162 bgcolor=#FA8072
| 307162 ||  || — || February 19, 2002 || Socorro || LINEAR || — || align=right | 8.2 km || 
|-id=163 bgcolor=#fefefe
| 307163 ||  || — || February 20, 2002 || Socorro || LINEAR || FLO || align=right data-sort-value="0.66" | 660 m || 
|-id=164 bgcolor=#d6d6d6
| 307164 ||  || — || February 16, 2002 || Palomar || NEAT || — || align=right | 4.1 km || 
|-id=165 bgcolor=#fefefe
| 307165 ||  || — || March 9, 2002 || Socorro || LINEAR || H || align=right data-sort-value="0.91" | 910 m || 
|-id=166 bgcolor=#fefefe
| 307166 ||  || — || March 11, 2002 || Črni Vrh || Črni Vrh || — || align=right | 1.2 km || 
|-id=167 bgcolor=#FA8072
| 307167 ||  || — || March 13, 2002 || Socorro || LINEAR || H || align=right data-sort-value="0.95" | 950 m || 
|-id=168 bgcolor=#fefefe
| 307168 ||  || — || March 12, 2002 || Desert Eagle || W. K. Y. Yeung || — || align=right data-sort-value="0.96" | 960 m || 
|-id=169 bgcolor=#fefefe
| 307169 ||  || — || March 6, 2002 || Palomar || NEAT || — || align=right | 1.2 km || 
|-id=170 bgcolor=#d6d6d6
| 307170 ||  || — || March 9, 2002 || Socorro || LINEAR || — || align=right | 3.4 km || 
|-id=171 bgcolor=#d6d6d6
| 307171 ||  || — || March 9, 2002 || Palomar || NEAT || — || align=right | 4.2 km || 
|-id=172 bgcolor=#fefefe
| 307172 ||  || — || March 11, 2002 || Palomar || NEAT || NYS || align=right data-sort-value="0.96" | 960 m || 
|-id=173 bgcolor=#fefefe
| 307173 ||  || — || March 12, 2002 || Socorro || LINEAR || V || align=right data-sort-value="0.88" | 880 m || 
|-id=174 bgcolor=#d6d6d6
| 307174 ||  || — || March 12, 2002 || Palomar || NEAT || LIX || align=right | 5.0 km || 
|-id=175 bgcolor=#fefefe
| 307175 ||  || — || March 12, 2002 || Palomar || NEAT || MAS || align=right data-sort-value="0.77" | 770 m || 
|-id=176 bgcolor=#fefefe
| 307176 ||  || — || March 13, 2002 || Socorro || LINEAR || — || align=right data-sort-value="0.87" | 870 m || 
|-id=177 bgcolor=#fefefe
| 307177 ||  || — || March 13, 2002 || Socorro || LINEAR || — || align=right | 1.5 km || 
|-id=178 bgcolor=#fefefe
| 307178 ||  || — || March 13, 2002 || Socorro || LINEAR || NYS || align=right data-sort-value="0.73" | 730 m || 
|-id=179 bgcolor=#E9E9E9
| 307179 ||  || — || March 13, 2002 || Socorro || LINEAR || — || align=right | 1.3 km || 
|-id=180 bgcolor=#d6d6d6
| 307180 ||  || — || March 13, 2002 || Socorro || LINEAR || — || align=right | 3.4 km || 
|-id=181 bgcolor=#E9E9E9
| 307181 ||  || — || March 13, 2002 || Socorro || LINEAR || RAF || align=right | 1.8 km || 
|-id=182 bgcolor=#d6d6d6
| 307182 ||  || — || March 14, 2002 || Palomar || NEAT || — || align=right | 4.9 km || 
|-id=183 bgcolor=#E9E9E9
| 307183 ||  || — || March 9, 2002 || Socorro || LINEAR || — || align=right | 1.6 km || 
|-id=184 bgcolor=#d6d6d6
| 307184 ||  || — || March 12, 2002 || Palomar || NEAT || EOS || align=right | 2.7 km || 
|-id=185 bgcolor=#E9E9E9
| 307185 ||  || — || March 15, 2002 || Socorro || LINEAR || MAR || align=right | 1.3 km || 
|-id=186 bgcolor=#fefefe
| 307186 ||  || — || March 9, 2002 || Socorro || LINEAR || NYS || align=right | 1.0 km || 
|-id=187 bgcolor=#d6d6d6
| 307187 ||  || — || March 9, 2002 || Anderson Mesa || LONEOS || — || align=right | 4.8 km || 
|-id=188 bgcolor=#E9E9E9
| 307188 ||  || — || March 9, 2002 || Anderson Mesa || LONEOS || — || align=right | 1.3 km || 
|-id=189 bgcolor=#E9E9E9
| 307189 ||  || — || March 12, 2002 || Socorro || LINEAR || — || align=right | 2.3 km || 
|-id=190 bgcolor=#FA8072
| 307190 ||  || — || March 12, 2002 || Anderson Mesa || LONEOS || — || align=right | 1.6 km || 
|-id=191 bgcolor=#fefefe
| 307191 ||  || — || March 13, 2002 || Palomar || NEAT || — || align=right data-sort-value="0.95" | 950 m || 
|-id=192 bgcolor=#fefefe
| 307192 ||  || — || March 13, 2002 || Palomar || NEAT || — || align=right data-sort-value="0.86" | 860 m || 
|-id=193 bgcolor=#d6d6d6
| 307193 ||  || — || March 13, 2002 || Palomar || NEAT || THM || align=right | 2.4 km || 
|-id=194 bgcolor=#fefefe
| 307194 ||  || — || March 15, 2002 || Palomar || NEAT || FLO || align=right | 1.0 km || 
|-id=195 bgcolor=#d6d6d6
| 307195 ||  || — || October 26, 2005 || Kitt Peak || Spacewatch || — || align=right | 4.1 km || 
|-id=196 bgcolor=#fefefe
| 307196 ||  || — || March 19, 2002 || Fountain Hills || Fountain Hills Obs. || — || align=right | 1.6 km || 
|-id=197 bgcolor=#FA8072
| 307197 ||  || — || March 19, 2002 || Palomar || NEAT || — || align=right data-sort-value="0.87" | 870 m || 
|-id=198 bgcolor=#FA8072
| 307198 ||  || — || March 18, 2002 || Socorro || LINEAR || — || align=right | 2.6 km || 
|-id=199 bgcolor=#d6d6d6
| 307199 ||  || — || March 30, 2002 || Palomar || NEAT || — || align=right | 4.0 km || 
|-id=200 bgcolor=#d6d6d6
| 307200 ||  || — || March 16, 2002 || Socorro || LINEAR || EUP || align=right | 4.9 km || 
|}

307201–307300 

|-bgcolor=#d6d6d6
| 307201 ||  || — || March 16, 2002 || Socorro || LINEAR || MEL || align=right | 4.0 km || 
|-id=202 bgcolor=#fefefe
| 307202 ||  || — || March 16, 2002 || Haleakala || NEAT || — || align=right | 1.1 km || 
|-id=203 bgcolor=#fefefe
| 307203 ||  || — || March 16, 2002 || Haleakala || NEAT || — || align=right data-sort-value="0.87" | 870 m || 
|-id=204 bgcolor=#d6d6d6
| 307204 ||  || — || March 16, 2002 || Haleakala || NEAT || LIX || align=right | 4.0 km || 
|-id=205 bgcolor=#fefefe
| 307205 ||  || — || March 20, 2002 || Socorro || LINEAR || — || align=right | 1.1 km || 
|-id=206 bgcolor=#fefefe
| 307206 ||  || — || March 21, 2002 || Socorro || LINEAR || — || align=right | 1.5 km || 
|-id=207 bgcolor=#d6d6d6
| 307207 ||  || — || March 21, 2002 || Socorro || LINEAR || TIR || align=right | 4.5 km || 
|-id=208 bgcolor=#fefefe
| 307208 ||  || — || April 5, 2002 || Palomar || NEAT || PHO || align=right | 1.2 km || 
|-id=209 bgcolor=#E9E9E9
| 307209 ||  || — || April 9, 2002 || Socorro || LINEAR || — || align=right | 1.8 km || 
|-id=210 bgcolor=#E9E9E9
| 307210 ||  || — || April 14, 2002 || Desert Eagle || W. K. Y. Yeung || ADE || align=right | 3.0 km || 
|-id=211 bgcolor=#fefefe
| 307211 ||  || — || April 14, 2002 || Socorro || LINEAR || — || align=right data-sort-value="0.89" | 890 m || 
|-id=212 bgcolor=#E9E9E9
| 307212 ||  || — || April 4, 2002 || Palomar || NEAT || — || align=right | 1.8 km || 
|-id=213 bgcolor=#fefefe
| 307213 ||  || — || April 4, 2002 || Palomar || NEAT || MAS || align=right data-sort-value="0.93" | 930 m || 
|-id=214 bgcolor=#E9E9E9
| 307214 ||  || — || April 4, 2002 || Haleakala || NEAT || — || align=right | 2.6 km || 
|-id=215 bgcolor=#fefefe
| 307215 ||  || — || April 8, 2002 || Palomar || NEAT || — || align=right | 1.3 km || 
|-id=216 bgcolor=#fefefe
| 307216 ||  || — || April 9, 2002 || Anderson Mesa || LONEOS || — || align=right | 1.1 km || 
|-id=217 bgcolor=#fefefe
| 307217 ||  || — || April 9, 2002 || Anderson Mesa || LONEOS || — || align=right | 2.7 km || 
|-id=218 bgcolor=#E9E9E9
| 307218 ||  || — || April 9, 2002 || Kitt Peak || Spacewatch || — || align=right | 2.0 km || 
|-id=219 bgcolor=#fefefe
| 307219 ||  || — || April 10, 2002 || Socorro || LINEAR || NYS || align=right data-sort-value="0.77" | 770 m || 
|-id=220 bgcolor=#E9E9E9
| 307220 ||  || — || April 10, 2002 || Socorro || LINEAR || — || align=right | 2.0 km || 
|-id=221 bgcolor=#fefefe
| 307221 ||  || — || April 10, 2002 || Socorro || LINEAR || — || align=right | 1.2 km || 
|-id=222 bgcolor=#fefefe
| 307222 ||  || — || April 9, 2002 || Kitt Peak || Spacewatch || — || align=right | 1.0 km || 
|-id=223 bgcolor=#E9E9E9
| 307223 ||  || — || April 10, 2002 || Socorro || LINEAR || — || align=right | 2.2 km || 
|-id=224 bgcolor=#d6d6d6
| 307224 ||  || — || April 10, 2002 || Socorro || LINEAR || — || align=right | 3.9 km || 
|-id=225 bgcolor=#fefefe
| 307225 ||  || — || April 11, 2002 || Palomar || NEAT || H || align=right data-sort-value="0.82" | 820 m || 
|-id=226 bgcolor=#fefefe
| 307226 ||  || — || April 11, 2002 || Socorro || LINEAR || — || align=right | 1.1 km || 
|-id=227 bgcolor=#FA8072
| 307227 ||  || — || April 10, 2002 || Socorro || LINEAR || — || align=right data-sort-value="0.88" | 880 m || 
|-id=228 bgcolor=#fefefe
| 307228 ||  || — || April 13, 2002 || Palomar || NEAT || — || align=right | 1.1 km || 
|-id=229 bgcolor=#fefefe
| 307229 ||  || — || April 14, 2002 || Socorro || LINEAR || NYS || align=right data-sort-value="0.71" | 710 m || 
|-id=230 bgcolor=#fefefe
| 307230 ||  || — || April 14, 2002 || Palomar || NEAT || NYS || align=right data-sort-value="0.75" | 750 m || 
|-id=231 bgcolor=#fefefe
| 307231 ||  || — || April 10, 2002 || Socorro || LINEAR || — || align=right data-sort-value="0.95" | 950 m || 
|-id=232 bgcolor=#fefefe
| 307232 ||  || — || April 9, 2002 || Palomar || NEAT || — || align=right data-sort-value="0.76" | 760 m || 
|-id=233 bgcolor=#fefefe
| 307233 ||  || — || April 16, 2002 || Socorro || LINEAR || — || align=right | 3.3 km || 
|-id=234 bgcolor=#fefefe
| 307234 ||  || — || April 20, 2002 || Palomar || NEAT || PHO || align=right | 1.1 km || 
|-id=235 bgcolor=#fefefe
| 307235 ||  || — || April 17, 2002 || Socorro || LINEAR || — || align=right | 1.3 km || 
|-id=236 bgcolor=#d6d6d6
| 307236 ||  || — || May 4, 2002 || Socorro || LINEAR || EUP || align=right | 6.5 km || 
|-id=237 bgcolor=#fefefe
| 307237 ||  || — || May 6, 2002 || Kitt Peak || Spacewatch || — || align=right | 1.0 km || 
|-id=238 bgcolor=#fefefe
| 307238 ||  || — || May 9, 2002 || Socorro || LINEAR || — || align=right | 1.5 km || 
|-id=239 bgcolor=#fefefe
| 307239 ||  || — || May 9, 2002 || Socorro || LINEAR || H || align=right data-sort-value="0.90" | 900 m || 
|-id=240 bgcolor=#FA8072
| 307240 ||  || — || May 9, 2002 || Socorro || LINEAR || — || align=right | 1.6 km || 
|-id=241 bgcolor=#fefefe
| 307241 ||  || — || May 11, 2002 || Socorro || LINEAR || MAS || align=right data-sort-value="0.95" | 950 m || 
|-id=242 bgcolor=#fefefe
| 307242 ||  || — || May 11, 2002 || Socorro || LINEAR || NYS || align=right data-sort-value="0.88" | 880 m || 
|-id=243 bgcolor=#fefefe
| 307243 ||  || — || May 15, 2002 || Nogales || Tenagra II Obs. || — || align=right data-sort-value="0.71" | 710 m || 
|-id=244 bgcolor=#d6d6d6
| 307244 ||  || — || May 6, 2002 || Palomar || NEAT || EOS || align=right | 3.1 km || 
|-id=245 bgcolor=#fefefe
| 307245 ||  || — || May 7, 2002 || Palomar || NEAT || V || align=right | 1.0 km || 
|-id=246 bgcolor=#E9E9E9
| 307246 ||  || — || May 7, 2002 || Anderson Mesa || LONEOS || — || align=right | 1.5 km || 
|-id=247 bgcolor=#E9E9E9
| 307247 ||  || — || November 11, 2004 || Kitt Peak || Spacewatch || — || align=right | 2.9 km || 
|-id=248 bgcolor=#fefefe
| 307248 ||  || — || November 12, 2007 || Mount Lemmon || Mount Lemmon Survey || — || align=right | 1.1 km || 
|-id=249 bgcolor=#d6d6d6
| 307249 ||  || — || May 5, 1997 || Kitt Peak || Spacewatch || CHA || align=right | 3.2 km || 
|-id=250 bgcolor=#fefefe
| 307250 ||  || — || May 29, 2002 || Haleakala || NEAT || H || align=right data-sort-value="0.73" | 730 m || 
|-id=251 bgcolor=#C2E0FF
| 307251 ||  || — || May 17, 2002 || Palomar || C. Trujillo, M. E. Brown || cubewano?critical || align=right | 336 km || 
|-id=252 bgcolor=#fefefe
| 307252 ||  || — || June 2, 2002 || Palomar || NEAT || — || align=right | 1.2 km || 
|-id=253 bgcolor=#E9E9E9
| 307253 ||  || — || June 3, 2002 || Socorro || LINEAR || MAR || align=right | 1.8 km || 
|-id=254 bgcolor=#d6d6d6
| 307254 ||  || — || June 11, 2002 || Socorro || LINEAR || EUP || align=right | 8.3 km || 
|-id=255 bgcolor=#E9E9E9
| 307255 ||  || — || June 14, 2002 || Socorro || LINEAR || — || align=right | 1.7 km || 
|-id=256 bgcolor=#E9E9E9
| 307256 ||  || — || June 15, 2002 || Socorro || LINEAR || — || align=right | 2.0 km || 
|-id=257 bgcolor=#E9E9E9
| 307257 ||  || — || June 13, 2002 || Palomar || NEAT || — || align=right | 1.2 km || 
|-id=258 bgcolor=#fefefe
| 307258 ||  || — || September 19, 2006 || Catalina || CSS || — || align=right data-sort-value="0.77" | 770 m || 
|-id=259 bgcolor=#E9E9E9
| 307259 ||  || — || June 19, 2002 || Campo Imperatore || CINEOS || — || align=right | 3.7 km || 
|-id=260 bgcolor=#E9E9E9
| 307260 ||  || — || June 24, 2002 || Haleakala || NEAT || — || align=right | 1.9 km || 
|-id=261 bgcolor=#C2E0FF
| 307261 ||  || — || June 18, 2002 || Palomar || C. Trujillo, M. E. Brown || other TNOcritical || align=right | 784 km || 
|-id=262 bgcolor=#E9E9E9
| 307262 ||  || — || July 9, 2002 || Socorro || LINEAR || — || align=right | 1.5 km || 
|-id=263 bgcolor=#FA8072
| 307263 ||  || — || July 9, 2002 || Socorro || LINEAR || — || align=right | 3.3 km || 
|-id=264 bgcolor=#E9E9E9
| 307264 ||  || — || July 15, 2002 || Palomar || NEAT || — || align=right | 1.1 km || 
|-id=265 bgcolor=#E9E9E9
| 307265 ||  || — || July 14, 2002 || Palomar || NEAT || EUN || align=right | 1.6 km || 
|-id=266 bgcolor=#fefefe
| 307266 ||  || — || July 14, 2002 || Palomar || NEAT || ERI || align=right | 1.9 km || 
|-id=267 bgcolor=#d6d6d6
| 307267 ||  || — || July 14, 2002 || Socorro || LINEAR || — || align=right | 3.7 km || 
|-id=268 bgcolor=#fefefe
| 307268 ||  || — || July 14, 2002 || Palomar || NEAT || V || align=right data-sort-value="0.93" | 930 m || 
|-id=269 bgcolor=#E9E9E9
| 307269 ||  || — || July 4, 2002 || Palomar || NEAT || — || align=right | 1.4 km || 
|-id=270 bgcolor=#E9E9E9
| 307270 ||  || — || July 8, 2002 || Palomar || NEAT || — || align=right | 1.5 km || 
|-id=271 bgcolor=#E9E9E9
| 307271 ||  || — || July 12, 2002 || Palomar || NEAT || ADE || align=right | 2.8 km || 
|-id=272 bgcolor=#E9E9E9
| 307272 ||  || — || July 9, 2002 || Palomar || NEAT || — || align=right | 1.2 km || 
|-id=273 bgcolor=#E9E9E9
| 307273 ||  || — || March 11, 2005 || Mount Lemmon || Mount Lemmon Survey || — || align=right data-sort-value="0.92" | 920 m || 
|-id=274 bgcolor=#E9E9E9
| 307274 ||  || — || July 18, 2002 || Socorro || LINEAR || — || align=right | 1.5 km || 
|-id=275 bgcolor=#fefefe
| 307275 ||  || — || July 20, 2002 || Palomar || NEAT || — || align=right | 2.0 km || 
|-id=276 bgcolor=#E9E9E9
| 307276 ||  || — || August 6, 2002 || Palomar || NEAT || — || align=right data-sort-value="0.89" | 890 m || 
|-id=277 bgcolor=#d6d6d6
| 307277 ||  || — || August 6, 2002 || Palomar || NEAT || — || align=right | 4.9 km || 
|-id=278 bgcolor=#E9E9E9
| 307278 ||  || — || August 8, 2002 || Palomar || NEAT || — || align=right | 1.5 km || 
|-id=279 bgcolor=#d6d6d6
| 307279 ||  || — || August 9, 2002 || Socorro || LINEAR || — || align=right | 6.0 km || 
|-id=280 bgcolor=#E9E9E9
| 307280 ||  || — || August 11, 2002 || Socorro || LINEAR || — || align=right | 2.5 km || 
|-id=281 bgcolor=#E9E9E9
| 307281 ||  || — || August 8, 2002 || Palomar || NEAT || EUN || align=right | 1.5 km || 
|-id=282 bgcolor=#d6d6d6
| 307282 ||  || — || August 12, 2002 || Socorro || LINEAR || — || align=right | 5.3 km || 
|-id=283 bgcolor=#E9E9E9
| 307283 ||  || — || August 12, 2002 || Socorro || LINEAR || — || align=right | 1.7 km || 
|-id=284 bgcolor=#E9E9E9
| 307284 ||  || — || August 13, 2002 || Palomar || NEAT || — || align=right | 1.2 km || 
|-id=285 bgcolor=#E9E9E9
| 307285 ||  || — || August 9, 2002 || Socorro || LINEAR || — || align=right | 2.9 km || 
|-id=286 bgcolor=#d6d6d6
| 307286 ||  || — || August 14, 2002 || Socorro || LINEAR || Tj (2.85) || align=right | 5.5 km || 
|-id=287 bgcolor=#E9E9E9
| 307287 ||  || — || August 14, 2002 || Socorro || LINEAR || — || align=right | 1.9 km || 
|-id=288 bgcolor=#fefefe
| 307288 ||  || — || August 14, 2002 || Socorro || LINEAR || — || align=right | 1.4 km || 
|-id=289 bgcolor=#E9E9E9
| 307289 ||  || — || August 12, 2002 || Socorro || LINEAR || ADE || align=right | 2.3 km || 
|-id=290 bgcolor=#E9E9E9
| 307290 ||  || — || August 14, 2002 || Socorro || LINEAR || — || align=right | 1.6 km || 
|-id=291 bgcolor=#E9E9E9
| 307291 ||  || — || August 12, 2002 || Socorro || LINEAR || IAN || align=right | 1.6 km || 
|-id=292 bgcolor=#d6d6d6
| 307292 ||  || — || August 8, 2002 || Palomar || NEAT || NAE || align=right | 3.9 km || 
|-id=293 bgcolor=#E9E9E9
| 307293 ||  || — || August 15, 2002 || Palomar || NEAT || — || align=right | 1.8 km || 
|-id=294 bgcolor=#fefefe
| 307294 ||  || — || August 8, 2002 || Palomar || NEAT || — || align=right | 1.4 km || 
|-id=295 bgcolor=#E9E9E9
| 307295 ||  || — || August 8, 2002 || Palomar || NEAT || RAF || align=right data-sort-value="0.91" | 910 m || 
|-id=296 bgcolor=#d6d6d6
| 307296 ||  || — || February 2, 2005 || Catalina || CSS || — || align=right | 4.0 km || 
|-id=297 bgcolor=#E9E9E9
| 307297 ||  || — || August 16, 2002 || Palomar || NEAT || — || align=right | 1.1 km || 
|-id=298 bgcolor=#FA8072
| 307298 ||  || — || August 16, 2002 || Socorro || LINEAR || — || align=right | 1.4 km || 
|-id=299 bgcolor=#E9E9E9
| 307299 ||  || — || August 26, 2002 || Palomar || NEAT || — || align=right | 1.1 km || 
|-id=300 bgcolor=#E9E9E9
| 307300 ||  || — || August 26, 2002 || Palomar || NEAT || — || align=right | 1.2 km || 
|}

307301–307400 

|-bgcolor=#E9E9E9
| 307301 ||  || — || August 28, 2002 || Palomar || NEAT || — || align=right | 3.0 km || 
|-id=302 bgcolor=#E9E9E9
| 307302 ||  || — || August 29, 2002 || Palomar || NEAT || — || align=right | 2.3 km || 
|-id=303 bgcolor=#E9E9E9
| 307303 ||  || — || August 29, 2002 || Palomar || S. F. Hönig || — || align=right data-sort-value="0.91" | 910 m || 
|-id=304 bgcolor=#E9E9E9
| 307304 ||  || — || August 18, 2002 || Palomar || NEAT || — || align=right | 1.4 km || 
|-id=305 bgcolor=#d6d6d6
| 307305 ||  || — || August 24, 2002 || Palomar || NEAT || — || align=right | 6.0 km || 
|-id=306 bgcolor=#E9E9E9
| 307306 ||  || — || August 18, 2002 || Palomar || NEAT || — || align=right | 1.6 km || 
|-id=307 bgcolor=#E9E9E9
| 307307 ||  || — || August 28, 2002 || Palomar || NEAT || GEF || align=right | 1.8 km || 
|-id=308 bgcolor=#E9E9E9
| 307308 ||  || — || August 30, 2002 || Palomar || NEAT || — || align=right | 1.2 km || 
|-id=309 bgcolor=#fefefe
| 307309 ||  || — || August 29, 2002 || Palomar || NEAT || — || align=right | 1.1 km || 
|-id=310 bgcolor=#E9E9E9
| 307310 ||  || — || August 27, 2002 || Palomar || NEAT || — || align=right | 2.5 km || 
|-id=311 bgcolor=#fefefe
| 307311 ||  || — || August 30, 2002 || Palomar || NEAT || — || align=right | 1.1 km || 
|-id=312 bgcolor=#fefefe
| 307312 ||  || — || August 16, 2002 || Palomar || NEAT || PHO || align=right | 1.7 km || 
|-id=313 bgcolor=#E9E9E9
| 307313 ||  || — || August 17, 2002 || Palomar || NEAT || — || align=right data-sort-value="0.97" | 970 m || 
|-id=314 bgcolor=#fefefe
| 307314 ||  || — || August 27, 2002 || Palomar || NEAT || — || align=right data-sort-value="0.78" | 780 m || 
|-id=315 bgcolor=#E9E9E9
| 307315 ||  || — || August 30, 2002 || Palomar || NEAT || — || align=right | 1.6 km || 
|-id=316 bgcolor=#E9E9E9
| 307316 ||  || — || August 18, 2002 || Palomar || NEAT || — || align=right data-sort-value="0.98" | 980 m || 
|-id=317 bgcolor=#E9E9E9
| 307317 ||  || — || August 30, 2002 || Palomar || NEAT || — || align=right | 1.5 km || 
|-id=318 bgcolor=#E9E9E9
| 307318 ||  || — || August 30, 2002 || Palomar || NEAT || — || align=right | 1.6 km || 
|-id=319 bgcolor=#E9E9E9
| 307319 ||  || — || August 17, 2002 || Palomar || NEAT || — || align=right | 1.6 km || 
|-id=320 bgcolor=#E9E9E9
| 307320 ||  || — || August 17, 2002 || Palomar || NEAT || — || align=right data-sort-value="0.98" | 980 m || 
|-id=321 bgcolor=#d6d6d6
| 307321 ||  || — || August 17, 2002 || Palomar || NEAT || 3:2 || align=right | 5.2 km || 
|-id=322 bgcolor=#E9E9E9
| 307322 ||  || — || August 20, 2002 || Palomar || NEAT || MIS || align=right | 2.3 km || 
|-id=323 bgcolor=#d6d6d6
| 307323 ||  || — || August 29, 2002 || Palomar || NEAT || 3:2 || align=right | 4.1 km || 
|-id=324 bgcolor=#E9E9E9
| 307324 ||  || — || August 29, 2002 || Palomar || NEAT || — || align=right | 1.5 km || 
|-id=325 bgcolor=#E9E9E9
| 307325 ||  || — || August 29, 2002 || Palomar || NEAT || — || align=right | 1.3 km || 
|-id=326 bgcolor=#E9E9E9
| 307326 ||  || — || August 27, 2002 || Palomar || NEAT || — || align=right | 2.2 km || 
|-id=327 bgcolor=#E9E9E9
| 307327 ||  || — || June 18, 2006 || Kitt Peak || Spacewatch || — || align=right | 1.3 km || 
|-id=328 bgcolor=#E9E9E9
| 307328 ||  || — || December 18, 2003 || Socorro || LINEAR || — || align=right | 1.3 km || 
|-id=329 bgcolor=#E9E9E9
| 307329 ||  || — || September 3, 2002 || Palomar || NEAT || EUN || align=right | 1.6 km || 
|-id=330 bgcolor=#E9E9E9
| 307330 ||  || — || September 3, 2002 || Palomar || NEAT || — || align=right | 2.0 km || 
|-id=331 bgcolor=#d6d6d6
| 307331 ||  || — || September 4, 2002 || Palomar || NEAT || — || align=right | 4.7 km || 
|-id=332 bgcolor=#E9E9E9
| 307332 ||  || — || September 4, 2002 || Anderson Mesa || LONEOS || — || align=right | 1.9 km || 
|-id=333 bgcolor=#E9E9E9
| 307333 ||  || — || September 2, 2002 || Palomar || NEAT || EUN || align=right | 1.2 km || 
|-id=334 bgcolor=#E9E9E9
| 307334 ||  || — || September 4, 2002 || Anderson Mesa || LONEOS || — || align=right | 1.2 km || 
|-id=335 bgcolor=#E9E9E9
| 307335 ||  || — || September 4, 2002 || Anderson Mesa || LONEOS || RAF || align=right | 1.2 km || 
|-id=336 bgcolor=#E9E9E9
| 307336 ||  || — || September 5, 2002 || Anderson Mesa || LONEOS || — || align=right | 3.7 km || 
|-id=337 bgcolor=#fefefe
| 307337 ||  || — || September 5, 2002 || Socorro || LINEAR || NYS || align=right | 1.1 km || 
|-id=338 bgcolor=#E9E9E9
| 307338 ||  || — || September 5, 2002 || Socorro || LINEAR || ADE || align=right | 2.4 km || 
|-id=339 bgcolor=#E9E9E9
| 307339 ||  || — || September 5, 2002 || Socorro || LINEAR || — || align=right | 2.1 km || 
|-id=340 bgcolor=#fefefe
| 307340 ||  || — || September 5, 2002 || Anderson Mesa || LONEOS || — || align=right | 1.4 km || 
|-id=341 bgcolor=#E9E9E9
| 307341 ||  || — || September 5, 2002 || Socorro || LINEAR || — || align=right | 2.8 km || 
|-id=342 bgcolor=#E9E9E9
| 307342 ||  || — || September 3, 2002 || Palomar || NEAT || — || align=right | 2.1 km || 
|-id=343 bgcolor=#E9E9E9
| 307343 ||  || — || September 4, 2002 || Palomar || NEAT || — || align=right | 1.6 km || 
|-id=344 bgcolor=#d6d6d6
| 307344 ||  || — || September 2, 2002 || Kvistaberg || UDAS || EUP || align=right | 7.6 km || 
|-id=345 bgcolor=#fefefe
| 307345 ||  || — || September 11, 2002 || Palomar || NEAT || NYS || align=right data-sort-value="0.76" | 760 m || 
|-id=346 bgcolor=#E9E9E9
| 307346 ||  || — || September 11, 2002 || Palomar || NEAT || — || align=right | 2.2 km || 
|-id=347 bgcolor=#E9E9E9
| 307347 ||  || — || September 11, 2002 || Palomar || NEAT || — || align=right data-sort-value="0.99" | 990 m || 
|-id=348 bgcolor=#E9E9E9
| 307348 ||  || — || September 11, 2002 || Palomar || NEAT || — || align=right | 1.3 km || 
|-id=349 bgcolor=#E9E9E9
| 307349 ||  || — || September 11, 2002 || Palomar || NEAT || — || align=right | 1.8 km || 
|-id=350 bgcolor=#E9E9E9
| 307350 ||  || — || September 11, 2002 || Palomar || NEAT || — || align=right | 1.4 km || 
|-id=351 bgcolor=#E9E9E9
| 307351 ||  || — || September 11, 2002 || Palomar || NEAT || — || align=right | 1.8 km || 
|-id=352 bgcolor=#E9E9E9
| 307352 ||  || — || September 11, 2002 || Palomar || NEAT || — || align=right | 1.5 km || 
|-id=353 bgcolor=#E9E9E9
| 307353 ||  || — || September 12, 2002 || Palomar || NEAT || — || align=right | 1.3 km || 
|-id=354 bgcolor=#fefefe
| 307354 ||  || — || September 13, 2002 || Palomar || NEAT || — || align=right data-sort-value="0.73" | 730 m || 
|-id=355 bgcolor=#fefefe
| 307355 ||  || — || September 13, 2002 || Haleakala || NEAT || — || align=right | 1.1 km || 
|-id=356 bgcolor=#fefefe
| 307356 ||  || — || September 14, 2002 || Palomar || NEAT || V || align=right data-sort-value="0.95" | 950 m || 
|-id=357 bgcolor=#E9E9E9
| 307357 ||  || — || September 14, 2002 || Goodricke-Pigott || R. A. Tucker || MIS || align=right | 3.3 km || 
|-id=358 bgcolor=#E9E9E9
| 307358 ||  || — || September 15, 2002 || Kitt Peak || Spacewatch || — || align=right data-sort-value="0.93" | 930 m || 
|-id=359 bgcolor=#E9E9E9
| 307359 ||  || — || September 15, 2002 || Haleakala || NEAT || — || align=right | 3.3 km || 
|-id=360 bgcolor=#E9E9E9
| 307360 ||  || — || September 14, 2002 || Haleakala || NEAT || — || align=right | 1.8 km || 
|-id=361 bgcolor=#fefefe
| 307361 ||  || — || September 1, 2002 || Palomar || NEAT || MAS || align=right data-sort-value="0.87" | 870 m || 
|-id=362 bgcolor=#E9E9E9
| 307362 ||  || — || September 14, 2002 || Palomar || NEAT || — || align=right | 2.0 km || 
|-id=363 bgcolor=#E9E9E9
| 307363 ||  || — || August 14, 2002 || Socorro || LINEAR || — || align=right | 1.4 km || 
|-id=364 bgcolor=#E9E9E9
| 307364 ||  || — || September 14, 2002 || Palomar || NEAT || HEN || align=right data-sort-value="0.95" | 950 m || 
|-id=365 bgcolor=#fefefe
| 307365 ||  || — || September 14, 2002 || Palomar || NEAT || — || align=right | 1.4 km || 
|-id=366 bgcolor=#E9E9E9
| 307366 ||  || — || September 14, 2002 || Palomar || NEAT || — || align=right | 1.5 km || 
|-id=367 bgcolor=#E9E9E9
| 307367 ||  || — || September 15, 2002 || Palomar || NEAT || — || align=right | 1.4 km || 
|-id=368 bgcolor=#fefefe
| 307368 ||  || — || September 12, 2002 || Palomar || NEAT || — || align=right | 1.1 km || 
|-id=369 bgcolor=#E9E9E9
| 307369 ||  || — || September 13, 2002 || Palomar || NEAT || — || align=right | 1.2 km || 
|-id=370 bgcolor=#E9E9E9
| 307370 ||  || — || September 4, 2002 || Palomar || NEAT || — || align=right data-sort-value="0.95" | 950 m || 
|-id=371 bgcolor=#E9E9E9
| 307371 ||  || — || February 5, 2000 || Catalina || CSS || — || align=right | 1.8 km || 
|-id=372 bgcolor=#fefefe
| 307372 ||  || — || September 27, 2002 || Palomar || NEAT || V || align=right data-sort-value="0.98" | 980 m || 
|-id=373 bgcolor=#E9E9E9
| 307373 ||  || — || September 27, 2002 || Palomar || NEAT || MAR || align=right | 1.3 km || 
|-id=374 bgcolor=#E9E9E9
| 307374 ||  || — || September 26, 2002 || Palomar || NEAT || — || align=right | 1.8 km || 
|-id=375 bgcolor=#E9E9E9
| 307375 ||  || — || September 29, 2002 || Haleakala || NEAT || — || align=right | 4.7 km || 
|-id=376 bgcolor=#E9E9E9
| 307376 ||  || — || September 28, 2002 || Palomar || NEAT || — || align=right | 1.2 km || 
|-id=377 bgcolor=#E9E9E9
| 307377 ||  || — || September 29, 2002 || Kitt Peak || Spacewatch || MIS || align=right | 3.2 km || 
|-id=378 bgcolor=#FA8072
| 307378 ||  || — || September 17, 2002 || Palomar || NEAT || — || align=right | 1.5 km || 
|-id=379 bgcolor=#E9E9E9
| 307379 ||  || — || September 20, 2002 || Palomar || NEAT || MAR || align=right | 1.8 km || 
|-id=380 bgcolor=#E9E9E9
| 307380 ||  || — || September 30, 2002 || Socorro || LINEAR || — || align=right | 2.2 km || 
|-id=381 bgcolor=#d6d6d6
| 307381 ||  || — || September 17, 2002 || Palomar || NEAT || SHU3:2 || align=right | 5.5 km || 
|-id=382 bgcolor=#E9E9E9
| 307382 ||  || — || September 16, 2002 || Palomar || NEAT || — || align=right | 1.6 km || 
|-id=383 bgcolor=#E9E9E9
| 307383 ||  || — || September 26, 2002 || Palomar || NEAT || — || align=right | 1.4 km || 
|-id=384 bgcolor=#E9E9E9
| 307384 ||  || — || September 26, 2002 || Palomar || NEAT || — || align=right | 1.5 km || 
|-id=385 bgcolor=#d6d6d6
| 307385 ||  || — || September 26, 2002 || Palomar || NEAT || KOR || align=right | 1.4 km || 
|-id=386 bgcolor=#E9E9E9
| 307386 ||  || — || September 26, 2002 || Palomar || NEAT || — || align=right | 2.4 km || 
|-id=387 bgcolor=#E9E9E9
| 307387 ||  || — || October 16, 1998 || Kitt Peak || Spacewatch || — || align=right | 2.2 km || 
|-id=388 bgcolor=#fefefe
| 307388 ||  || — || October 1, 2002 || Anderson Mesa || LONEOS || — || align=right | 1.3 km || 
|-id=389 bgcolor=#E9E9E9
| 307389 ||  || — || October 3, 2002 || Fountain Hills || C. W. Juels, P. R. Holvorcem || — || align=right | 3.8 km || 
|-id=390 bgcolor=#E9E9E9
| 307390 ||  || — || October 2, 2002 || Socorro || LINEAR || — || align=right | 1.0 km || 
|-id=391 bgcolor=#fefefe
| 307391 ||  || — || October 2, 2002 || Socorro || LINEAR || V || align=right | 1.2 km || 
|-id=392 bgcolor=#E9E9E9
| 307392 ||  || — || October 2, 2002 || Socorro || LINEAR || — || align=right | 1.6 km || 
|-id=393 bgcolor=#fefefe
| 307393 ||  || — || October 2, 2002 || Socorro || LINEAR || — || align=right | 1.3 km || 
|-id=394 bgcolor=#E9E9E9
| 307394 ||  || — || October 2, 2002 || Socorro || LINEAR || EUN || align=right | 1.7 km || 
|-id=395 bgcolor=#d6d6d6
| 307395 ||  || — || October 7, 2002 || Socorro || LINEAR || ALA || align=right | 7.9 km || 
|-id=396 bgcolor=#E9E9E9
| 307396 ||  || — || October 1, 2002 || Anderson Mesa || LONEOS || — || align=right | 1.7 km || 
|-id=397 bgcolor=#fefefe
| 307397 ||  || — || October 2, 2002 || Socorro || LINEAR || — || align=right | 1.2 km || 
|-id=398 bgcolor=#E9E9E9
| 307398 ||  || — || October 2, 2002 || Socorro || LINEAR || — || align=right | 2.0 km || 
|-id=399 bgcolor=#E9E9E9
| 307399 ||  || — || October 2, 2002 || Haleakala || NEAT || — || align=right | 1.7 km || 
|-id=400 bgcolor=#E9E9E9
| 307400 ||  || — || October 2, 2002 || Campo Imperatore || CINEOS || — || align=right | 1.7 km || 
|}

307401–307500 

|-bgcolor=#E9E9E9
| 307401 ||  || — || October 4, 2002 || Palomar || NEAT || — || align=right | 2.1 km || 
|-id=402 bgcolor=#fefefe
| 307402 ||  || — || October 4, 2002 || Anderson Mesa || LONEOS || — || align=right | 1.3 km || 
|-id=403 bgcolor=#E9E9E9
| 307403 ||  || — || October 3, 2002 || Campo Imperatore || CINEOS || — || align=right | 5.0 km || 
|-id=404 bgcolor=#fefefe
| 307404 ||  || — || October 4, 2002 || Socorro || LINEAR || — || align=right data-sort-value="0.74" | 740 m || 
|-id=405 bgcolor=#E9E9E9
| 307405 ||  || — || October 5, 2002 || Palomar || NEAT || — || align=right | 2.3 km || 
|-id=406 bgcolor=#E9E9E9
| 307406 ||  || — || October 5, 2002 || Socorro || LINEAR || MAR || align=right | 1.8 km || 
|-id=407 bgcolor=#E9E9E9
| 307407 ||  || — || October 5, 2002 || Palomar || NEAT || — || align=right | 2.5 km || 
|-id=408 bgcolor=#E9E9E9
| 307408 ||  || — || October 3, 2002 || Palomar || NEAT || — || align=right | 1.7 km || 
|-id=409 bgcolor=#d6d6d6
| 307409 ||  || — || October 3, 2002 || Palomar || NEAT || — || align=right | 3.9 km || 
|-id=410 bgcolor=#E9E9E9
| 307410 ||  || — || October 4, 2002 || Socorro || LINEAR || — || align=right | 2.1 km || 
|-id=411 bgcolor=#E9E9E9
| 307411 ||  || — || October 11, 2002 || Palomar || NEAT || MAR || align=right | 1.6 km || 
|-id=412 bgcolor=#E9E9E9
| 307412 ||  || — || October 4, 2002 || Socorro || LINEAR || — || align=right | 1.7 km || 
|-id=413 bgcolor=#d6d6d6
| 307413 ||  || — || October 5, 2002 || Anderson Mesa || LONEOS || EUP || align=right | 6.3 km || 
|-id=414 bgcolor=#E9E9E9
| 307414 ||  || — || October 5, 2002 || Anderson Mesa || LONEOS || — || align=right | 2.3 km || 
|-id=415 bgcolor=#E9E9E9
| 307415 ||  || — || October 6, 2002 || Socorro || LINEAR || — || align=right | 2.1 km || 
|-id=416 bgcolor=#E9E9E9
| 307416 ||  || — || October 4, 2002 || Socorro || LINEAR || — || align=right | 1.9 km || 
|-id=417 bgcolor=#E9E9E9
| 307417 ||  || — || October 6, 2002 || Socorro || LINEAR || MAR || align=right | 1.5 km || 
|-id=418 bgcolor=#E9E9E9
| 307418 ||  || — || October 6, 2002 || Socorro || LINEAR || EUN || align=right | 1.4 km || 
|-id=419 bgcolor=#FA8072
| 307419 ||  || — || October 6, 2002 || Socorro || LINEAR || — || align=right | 5.3 km || 
|-id=420 bgcolor=#E9E9E9
| 307420 ||  || — || October 9, 2002 || Anderson Mesa || LONEOS || — || align=right | 1.3 km || 
|-id=421 bgcolor=#E9E9E9
| 307421 ||  || — || October 9, 2002 || Socorro || LINEAR || — || align=right | 1.9 km || 
|-id=422 bgcolor=#E9E9E9
| 307422 ||  || — || October 9, 2002 || Socorro || LINEAR || JUN || align=right | 1.5 km || 
|-id=423 bgcolor=#E9E9E9
| 307423 ||  || — || October 3, 2002 || Socorro || LINEAR || — || align=right | 4.1 km || 
|-id=424 bgcolor=#E9E9E9
| 307424 ||  || — || October 10, 2002 || Socorro || LINEAR || — || align=right | 2.9 km || 
|-id=425 bgcolor=#E9E9E9
| 307425 ||  || — || October 10, 2002 || Socorro || LINEAR || — || align=right | 2.0 km || 
|-id=426 bgcolor=#E9E9E9
| 307426 ||  || — || October 9, 2002 || Socorro || LINEAR || — || align=right | 1.4 km || 
|-id=427 bgcolor=#E9E9E9
| 307427 ||  || — || October 9, 2002 || Socorro || LINEAR || MAR || align=right | 1.5 km || 
|-id=428 bgcolor=#fefefe
| 307428 ||  || — || October 10, 2002 || Socorro || LINEAR || V || align=right | 1.3 km || 
|-id=429 bgcolor=#fefefe
| 307429 ||  || — || October 11, 2002 || Palomar || NEAT || — || align=right | 1.2 km || 
|-id=430 bgcolor=#E9E9E9
| 307430 ||  || — || October 11, 2002 || Socorro || LINEAR || — || align=right | 1.4 km || 
|-id=431 bgcolor=#E9E9E9
| 307431 ||  || — || October 4, 2002 || Apache Point || SDSS || — || align=right | 1.8 km || 
|-id=432 bgcolor=#fefefe
| 307432 ||  || — || October 4, 2002 || Apache Point || SDSS || V || align=right data-sort-value="0.71" | 710 m || 
|-id=433 bgcolor=#E9E9E9
| 307433 ||  || — || October 5, 2002 || Apache Point || SDSS || — || align=right | 1.6 km || 
|-id=434 bgcolor=#E9E9E9
| 307434 ||  || — || October 5, 2002 || Apache Point || SDSS || — || align=right data-sort-value="0.91" | 910 m || 
|-id=435 bgcolor=#E9E9E9
| 307435 ||  || — || October 5, 2002 || Apache Point || SDSS || — || align=right | 2.0 km || 
|-id=436 bgcolor=#E9E9E9
| 307436 ||  || — || October 10, 2002 || Apache Point || SDSS || — || align=right | 1.5 km || 
|-id=437 bgcolor=#E9E9E9
| 307437 ||  || — || October 10, 2002 || Apache Point || SDSS || — || align=right | 1.5 km || 
|-id=438 bgcolor=#fefefe
| 307438 ||  || — || October 5, 2002 || Apache Point || SDSS || — || align=right | 1.1 km || 
|-id=439 bgcolor=#E9E9E9
| 307439 ||  || — || October 28, 2002 || Nogales || C. W. Juels, P. R. Holvorcem || — || align=right | 1.2 km || 
|-id=440 bgcolor=#fefefe
| 307440 ||  || — || October 30, 2002 || Haleakala || NEAT || — || align=right | 1.4 km || 
|-id=441 bgcolor=#d6d6d6
| 307441 ||  || — || October 31, 2002 || Socorro || LINEAR || — || align=right | 7.0 km || 
|-id=442 bgcolor=#fefefe
| 307442 ||  || — || October 31, 2002 || Socorro || LINEAR || V || align=right | 1.1 km || 
|-id=443 bgcolor=#fefefe
| 307443 ||  || — || October 31, 2002 || Anderson Mesa || LONEOS || — || align=right | 1.4 km || 
|-id=444 bgcolor=#E9E9E9
| 307444 ||  || — || October 31, 2002 || Socorro || LINEAR || — || align=right | 2.8 km || 
|-id=445 bgcolor=#E9E9E9
| 307445 ||  || — || October 31, 2002 || Palomar || NEAT || ADE || align=right | 2.5 km || 
|-id=446 bgcolor=#E9E9E9
| 307446 ||  || — || October 30, 2002 || Kitt Peak || Spacewatch || — || align=right | 1.8 km || 
|-id=447 bgcolor=#E9E9E9
| 307447 ||  || — || October 31, 2002 || Palomar || NEAT || PAD || align=right | 2.0 km || 
|-id=448 bgcolor=#E9E9E9
| 307448 ||  || — || October 30, 2002 || Palomar || NEAT || ADE || align=right | 2.1 km || 
|-id=449 bgcolor=#E9E9E9
| 307449 ||  || — || January 31, 2009 || Mount Lemmon || Mount Lemmon Survey || WIT || align=right | 1.1 km || 
|-id=450 bgcolor=#E9E9E9
| 307450 ||  || — || November 1, 2002 || Palomar || NEAT || — || align=right | 1.8 km || 
|-id=451 bgcolor=#E9E9E9
| 307451 ||  || — || November 1, 2002 || Palomar || NEAT || JUN || align=right | 1.4 km || 
|-id=452 bgcolor=#E9E9E9
| 307452 ||  || — || November 6, 2002 || Needville || Needville Obs. || — || align=right | 1.9 km || 
|-id=453 bgcolor=#E9E9E9
| 307453 ||  || — || November 5, 2002 || Socorro || LINEAR || — || align=right | 2.3 km || 
|-id=454 bgcolor=#E9E9E9
| 307454 ||  || — || November 5, 2002 || Socorro || LINEAR || — || align=right | 1.4 km || 
|-id=455 bgcolor=#E9E9E9
| 307455 ||  || — || November 6, 2002 || Socorro || LINEAR || — || align=right | 1.5 km || 
|-id=456 bgcolor=#E9E9E9
| 307456 ||  || — || November 6, 2002 || Haleakala || NEAT || — || align=right | 1.1 km || 
|-id=457 bgcolor=#FA8072
| 307457 ||  || — || November 7, 2002 || Socorro || LINEAR || — || align=right | 2.2 km || 
|-id=458 bgcolor=#E9E9E9
| 307458 ||  || — || November 7, 2002 || Socorro || LINEAR || — || align=right | 2.6 km || 
|-id=459 bgcolor=#d6d6d6
| 307459 ||  || — || November 7, 2002 || Socorro || LINEAR || — || align=right | 4.3 km || 
|-id=460 bgcolor=#E9E9E9
| 307460 ||  || — || November 11, 2002 || Anderson Mesa || LONEOS || — || align=right | 1.1 km || 
|-id=461 bgcolor=#E9E9E9
| 307461 ||  || — || November 2, 2002 || Haleakala || NEAT || — || align=right | 1.0 km || 
|-id=462 bgcolor=#d6d6d6
| 307462 ||  || — || November 12, 2002 || Socorro || LINEAR || — || align=right | 3.3 km || 
|-id=463 bgcolor=#C2E0FF
| 307463 ||  || — || November 7, 2002 || Kitt Peak || M. W. Buie || plutinocritical || align=right | 293 km || 
|-id=464 bgcolor=#d6d6d6
| 307464 ||  || — || November 20, 2002 || Palomar || NEAT || Tj (2.9) || align=right | 6.8 km || 
|-id=465 bgcolor=#E9E9E9
| 307465 ||  || — || November 23, 2002 || Kingsnake || J. V. McClusky || JUN || align=right | 1.8 km || 
|-id=466 bgcolor=#E9E9E9
| 307466 ||  || — || November 30, 2002 || Socorro || LINEAR || — || align=right | 2.9 km || 
|-id=467 bgcolor=#E9E9E9
| 307467 ||  || — || November 24, 2002 || Palomar || NEAT || — || align=right | 2.3 km || 
|-id=468 bgcolor=#E9E9E9
| 307468 ||  || — || November 23, 2002 || Palomar || NEAT || — || align=right | 2.4 km || 
|-id=469 bgcolor=#E9E9E9
| 307469 ||  || — || November 24, 2002 || Palomar || NEAT || — || align=right | 3.1 km || 
|-id=470 bgcolor=#E9E9E9
| 307470 ||  || — || November 24, 2002 || Palomar || NEAT || PAD || align=right | 2.6 km || 
|-id=471 bgcolor=#E9E9E9
| 307471 ||  || — || December 1, 2002 || Socorro || LINEAR || — || align=right | 3.4 km || 
|-id=472 bgcolor=#E9E9E9
| 307472 ||  || — || December 2, 2002 || Socorro || LINEAR || ADE || align=right | 3.7 km || 
|-id=473 bgcolor=#E9E9E9
| 307473 ||  || — || December 3, 2002 || Palomar || NEAT || — || align=right | 1.8 km || 
|-id=474 bgcolor=#E9E9E9
| 307474 ||  || — || December 3, 2002 || Palomar || NEAT || — || align=right | 2.9 km || 
|-id=475 bgcolor=#E9E9E9
| 307475 ||  || — || December 2, 2002 || Socorro || LINEAR || — || align=right | 2.9 km || 
|-id=476 bgcolor=#E9E9E9
| 307476 ||  || — || December 3, 2002 || Palomar || NEAT || — || align=right | 1.6 km || 
|-id=477 bgcolor=#E9E9E9
| 307477 ||  || — || December 3, 2002 || Palomar || NEAT || JUN || align=right | 1.8 km || 
|-id=478 bgcolor=#E9E9E9
| 307478 ||  || — || December 6, 2002 || Socorro || LINEAR || GER || align=right | 3.3 km || 
|-id=479 bgcolor=#E9E9E9
| 307479 ||  || — || December 8, 2002 || Palomar || NEAT || MIT || align=right | 2.3 km || 
|-id=480 bgcolor=#fefefe
| 307480 ||  || — || December 5, 2002 || Socorro || LINEAR || FLO || align=right | 1.1 km || 
|-id=481 bgcolor=#E9E9E9
| 307481 ||  || — || December 6, 2002 || Socorro || LINEAR || — || align=right | 3.3 km || 
|-id=482 bgcolor=#E9E9E9
| 307482 ||  || — || December 7, 2002 || Socorro || LINEAR || — || align=right | 2.1 km || 
|-id=483 bgcolor=#E9E9E9
| 307483 ||  || — || December 10, 2002 || Socorro || LINEAR || NEM || align=right | 3.0 km || 
|-id=484 bgcolor=#E9E9E9
| 307484 ||  || — || December 10, 2002 || Palomar || NEAT || — || align=right | 1.5 km || 
|-id=485 bgcolor=#fefefe
| 307485 ||  || — || December 10, 2002 || Palomar || NEAT || — || align=right | 1.3 km || 
|-id=486 bgcolor=#fefefe
| 307486 ||  || — || December 10, 2002 || Socorro || LINEAR || H || align=right data-sort-value="0.98" | 980 m || 
|-id=487 bgcolor=#E9E9E9
| 307487 ||  || — || December 10, 2002 || Socorro || LINEAR || — || align=right | 3.4 km || 
|-id=488 bgcolor=#E9E9E9
| 307488 ||  || — || December 11, 2002 || Socorro || LINEAR || — || align=right | 1.8 km || 
|-id=489 bgcolor=#E9E9E9
| 307489 ||  || — || December 11, 2002 || Socorro || LINEAR || JUL || align=right | 1.8 km || 
|-id=490 bgcolor=#E9E9E9
| 307490 ||  || — || December 11, 2002 || Socorro || LINEAR || — || align=right | 2.3 km || 
|-id=491 bgcolor=#E9E9E9
| 307491 ||  || — || December 11, 2002 || Socorro || LINEAR || — || align=right | 1.7 km || 
|-id=492 bgcolor=#E9E9E9
| 307492 ||  || — || December 12, 2002 || Palomar || NEAT || — || align=right | 4.1 km || 
|-id=493 bgcolor=#FFC2E0
| 307493 ||  || — || December 14, 2002 || Socorro || LINEAR || APOPHA || align=right | 1.7 km || 
|-id=494 bgcolor=#E9E9E9
| 307494 ||  || — || December 5, 2002 || Socorro || LINEAR || — || align=right | 2.5 km || 
|-id=495 bgcolor=#E9E9E9
| 307495 ||  || — || December 5, 2002 || Socorro || LINEAR || — || align=right | 2.4 km || 
|-id=496 bgcolor=#E9E9E9
| 307496 ||  || — || December 5, 2002 || Socorro || LINEAR || — || align=right | 3.0 km || 
|-id=497 bgcolor=#E9E9E9
| 307497 ||  || — || December 6, 2002 || Socorro || LINEAR || ADE || align=right | 4.9 km || 
|-id=498 bgcolor=#E9E9E9
| 307498 ||  || — || December 6, 2002 || Socorro || LINEAR || — || align=right | 2.2 km || 
|-id=499 bgcolor=#E9E9E9
| 307499 ||  || — || December 10, 2002 || Palomar || NEAT || HEN || align=right | 1.2 km || 
|-id=500 bgcolor=#E9E9E9
| 307500 ||  || — || December 3, 2002 || Palomar || NEAT || — || align=right | 2.2 km || 
|}

307501–307600 

|-bgcolor=#E9E9E9
| 307501 ||  || — || December 27, 2002 || Anderson Mesa || LONEOS || — || align=right | 2.3 km || 
|-id=502 bgcolor=#E9E9E9
| 307502 ||  || — || December 28, 2002 || Kitt Peak || Spacewatch || — || align=right | 1.3 km || 
|-id=503 bgcolor=#E9E9E9
| 307503 ||  || — || December 31, 2002 || Socorro || LINEAR || — || align=right | 2.6 km || 
|-id=504 bgcolor=#E9E9E9
| 307504 ||  || — || December 31, 2002 || Socorro || LINEAR || ADE || align=right | 3.4 km || 
|-id=505 bgcolor=#FA8072
| 307505 ||  || — || December 31, 2002 || Socorro || LINEAR || — || align=right | 1.6 km || 
|-id=506 bgcolor=#E9E9E9
| 307506 ||  || — || December 31, 2002 || Eskridge || G. Hug || — || align=right | 1.5 km || 
|-id=507 bgcolor=#E9E9E9
| 307507 ||  || — || December 31, 2002 || Socorro || LINEAR || AEO || align=right | 1.9 km || 
|-id=508 bgcolor=#E9E9E9
| 307508 ||  || — || December 31, 2002 || Socorro || LINEAR || — || align=right | 3.4 km || 
|-id=509 bgcolor=#E9E9E9
| 307509 ||  || — || January 1, 2003 || Socorro || LINEAR || AEO || align=right | 1.5 km || 
|-id=510 bgcolor=#E9E9E9
| 307510 ||  || — || January 1, 2003 || Socorro || LINEAR || — || align=right | 2.6 km || 
|-id=511 bgcolor=#E9E9E9
| 307511 ||  || — || January 1, 2003 || Socorro || LINEAR || — || align=right | 1.3 km || 
|-id=512 bgcolor=#E9E9E9
| 307512 ||  || — || January 1, 2003 || Socorro || LINEAR || — || align=right | 4.1 km || 
|-id=513 bgcolor=#E9E9E9
| 307513 ||  || — || January 5, 2003 || Socorro || LINEAR || — || align=right | 4.6 km || 
|-id=514 bgcolor=#d6d6d6
| 307514 ||  || — || January 5, 2003 || Socorro || LINEAR || — || align=right | 4.5 km || 
|-id=515 bgcolor=#E9E9E9
| 307515 ||  || — || January 5, 2003 || Socorro || LINEAR || — || align=right | 2.0 km || 
|-id=516 bgcolor=#E9E9E9
| 307516 ||  || — || January 5, 2003 || Socorro || LINEAR || GEF || align=right | 1.9 km || 
|-id=517 bgcolor=#E9E9E9
| 307517 ||  || — || January 5, 2003 || Socorro || LINEAR || — || align=right | 2.5 km || 
|-id=518 bgcolor=#E9E9E9
| 307518 ||  || — || January 5, 2003 || Socorro || LINEAR || — || align=right | 1.6 km || 
|-id=519 bgcolor=#E9E9E9
| 307519 ||  || — || January 5, 2003 || Socorro || LINEAR || — || align=right | 3.8 km || 
|-id=520 bgcolor=#E9E9E9
| 307520 ||  || — || January 7, 2003 || Socorro || LINEAR || — || align=right | 3.1 km || 
|-id=521 bgcolor=#E9E9E9
| 307521 ||  || — || January 7, 2003 || Socorro || LINEAR || — || align=right | 2.2 km || 
|-id=522 bgcolor=#E9E9E9
| 307522 ||  || — || January 8, 2003 || Socorro || LINEAR || — || align=right | 1.0 km || 
|-id=523 bgcolor=#FA8072
| 307523 ||  || — || January 11, 2003 || Socorro || LINEAR || — || align=right | 3.4 km || 
|-id=524 bgcolor=#E9E9E9
| 307524 ||  || — || January 13, 2003 || Socorro || LINEAR || — || align=right | 3.1 km || 
|-id=525 bgcolor=#FA8072
| 307525 ||  || — || January 14, 2003 || Socorro || LINEAR || — || align=right | 2.6 km || 
|-id=526 bgcolor=#E9E9E9
| 307526 ||  || — || January 2, 2003 || Socorro || LINEAR || — || align=right | 1.6 km || 
|-id=527 bgcolor=#E9E9E9
| 307527 ||  || — || January 26, 2003 || Anderson Mesa || LONEOS || — || align=right | 2.5 km || 
|-id=528 bgcolor=#E9E9E9
| 307528 ||  || — || January 26, 2003 || Haleakala || NEAT || — || align=right | 2.5 km || 
|-id=529 bgcolor=#E9E9E9
| 307529 ||  || — || January 26, 2003 || Palomar || NEAT || — || align=right | 2.5 km || 
|-id=530 bgcolor=#E9E9E9
| 307530 ||  || — || January 25, 2003 || Palomar || NEAT || — || align=right | 4.1 km || 
|-id=531 bgcolor=#d6d6d6
| 307531 ||  || — || January 28, 2003 || Kitt Peak || Spacewatch || — || align=right | 4.7 km || 
|-id=532 bgcolor=#d6d6d6
| 307532 ||  || — || January 27, 2003 || Socorro || LINEAR || — || align=right | 3.9 km || 
|-id=533 bgcolor=#E9E9E9
| 307533 ||  || — || January 27, 2003 || Socorro || LINEAR || — || align=right | 1.5 km || 
|-id=534 bgcolor=#E9E9E9
| 307534 ||  || — || January 27, 2003 || Anderson Mesa || LONEOS || — || align=right | 2.9 km || 
|-id=535 bgcolor=#E9E9E9
| 307535 ||  || — || January 31, 2003 || Socorro || LINEAR || — || align=right | 2.2 km || 
|-id=536 bgcolor=#FA8072
| 307536 ||  || — || February 2, 2003 || Anderson Mesa || LONEOS || — || align=right | 4.5 km || 
|-id=537 bgcolor=#d6d6d6
| 307537 ||  || — || February 1, 2003 || Socorro || LINEAR || — || align=right | 2.8 km || 
|-id=538 bgcolor=#d6d6d6
| 307538 ||  || — || February 22, 2003 || Palomar || NEAT || Tj (2.95) || align=right | 4.5 km || 
|-id=539 bgcolor=#E9E9E9
| 307539 ||  || — || February 22, 2003 || Palomar || NEAT || — || align=right | 1.5 km || 
|-id=540 bgcolor=#d6d6d6
| 307540 ||  || — || February 25, 2003 || Haleakala || NEAT || 628 || align=right | 2.6 km || 
|-id=541 bgcolor=#E9E9E9
| 307541 ||  || — || February 26, 2003 || Socorro || LINEAR || INO || align=right | 1.6 km || 
|-id=542 bgcolor=#E9E9E9
| 307542 ||  || — || March 5, 2003 || Socorro || LINEAR || — || align=right | 1.4 km || 
|-id=543 bgcolor=#FA8072
| 307543 ||  || — || March 6, 2003 || Socorro || LINEAR || — || align=right | 2.8 km || 
|-id=544 bgcolor=#FA8072
| 307544 ||  || — || March 8, 2003 || Anderson Mesa || LONEOS || — || align=right | 1.8 km || 
|-id=545 bgcolor=#E9E9E9
| 307545 ||  || — || March 5, 2003 || Socorro || LINEAR || POS || align=right | 3.8 km || 
|-id=546 bgcolor=#d6d6d6
| 307546 ||  || — || March 6, 2003 || Anderson Mesa || LONEOS || — || align=right | 2.6 km || 
|-id=547 bgcolor=#E9E9E9
| 307547 ||  || — || March 6, 2003 || Socorro || LINEAR || — || align=right | 2.3 km || 
|-id=548 bgcolor=#fefefe
| 307548 ||  || — || March 6, 2003 || Anderson Mesa || LONEOS || FLO || align=right data-sort-value="0.70" | 700 m || 
|-id=549 bgcolor=#d6d6d6
| 307549 ||  || — || March 6, 2003 || Socorro || LINEAR || — || align=right | 3.5 km || 
|-id=550 bgcolor=#fefefe
| 307550 ||  || — || March 6, 2003 || Socorro || LINEAR || — || align=right | 2.3 km || 
|-id=551 bgcolor=#fefefe
| 307551 ||  || — || March 6, 2003 || Socorro || LINEAR || — || align=right | 1.2 km || 
|-id=552 bgcolor=#E9E9E9
| 307552 ||  || — || March 8, 2003 || Anderson Mesa || LONEOS || EUN || align=right | 2.0 km || 
|-id=553 bgcolor=#E9E9E9
| 307553 ||  || — || March 8, 2003 || Anderson Mesa || LONEOS || — || align=right | 1.6 km || 
|-id=554 bgcolor=#E9E9E9
| 307554 ||  || — || March 8, 2003 || Palomar || NEAT || — || align=right | 1.7 km || 
|-id=555 bgcolor=#d6d6d6
| 307555 ||  || — || March 9, 2003 || Kitt Peak || Spacewatch || — || align=right | 3.8 km || 
|-id=556 bgcolor=#FA8072
| 307556 ||  || — || March 10, 2003 || Socorro || LINEAR || — || align=right | 1.5 km || 
|-id=557 bgcolor=#fefefe
| 307557 ||  || — || March 9, 2003 || Socorro || LINEAR || — || align=right data-sort-value="0.94" | 940 m || 
|-id=558 bgcolor=#E9E9E9
| 307558 ||  || — || March 9, 2003 || Socorro || LINEAR || — || align=right | 1.4 km || 
|-id=559 bgcolor=#fefefe
| 307559 ||  || — || March 10, 2003 || Socorro || LINEAR || — || align=right | 1.2 km || 
|-id=560 bgcolor=#C2FFFF
| 307560 ||  || — || March 12, 2003 || Palomar || NEAT || L4 || align=right | 12 km || 
|-id=561 bgcolor=#E9E9E9
| 307561 ||  || — || March 9, 2003 || Palomar || NEAT || — || align=right | 1.7 km || 
|-id=562 bgcolor=#E9E9E9
| 307562 ||  || — || March 23, 2003 || Kleť || J. Tichá, M. Tichý || — || align=right | 1.9 km || 
|-id=563 bgcolor=#fefefe
| 307563 ||  || — || March 27, 2003 || Campo Imperatore || CINEOS || — || align=right | 1.2 km || 
|-id=564 bgcolor=#FFC2E0
| 307564 ||  || — || March 26, 2003 || Kitt Peak || Spacewatch || AMO || align=right data-sort-value="0.25" | 250 m || 
|-id=565 bgcolor=#d6d6d6
| 307565 ||  || — || March 23, 2003 || Kitt Peak || Spacewatch || — || align=right | 2.7 km || 
|-id=566 bgcolor=#FA8072
| 307566 ||  || — || March 25, 2003 || Palomar || NEAT || — || align=right | 1.1 km || 
|-id=567 bgcolor=#fefefe
| 307567 ||  || — || March 24, 2003 || Kitt Peak || Spacewatch || — || align=right data-sort-value="0.88" | 880 m || 
|-id=568 bgcolor=#fefefe
| 307568 ||  || — || March 24, 2003 || Kitt Peak || Spacewatch || — || align=right | 1.1 km || 
|-id=569 bgcolor=#C2FFFF
| 307569 ||  || — || March 26, 2003 || Palomar || NEAT || L4 || align=right | 13 km || 
|-id=570 bgcolor=#fefefe
| 307570 ||  || — || March 26, 2003 || Palomar || NEAT || — || align=right | 1.0 km || 
|-id=571 bgcolor=#d6d6d6
| 307571 ||  || — || March 29, 2003 || Anderson Mesa || LONEOS || — || align=right | 2.9 km || 
|-id=572 bgcolor=#d6d6d6
| 307572 ||  || — || March 31, 2003 || Socorro || LINEAR || — || align=right | 3.9 km || 
|-id=573 bgcolor=#E9E9E9
| 307573 ||  || — || March 26, 2003 || Palomar || NEAT || — || align=right | 1.4 km || 
|-id=574 bgcolor=#E9E9E9
| 307574 ||  || — || March 31, 2003 || Palomar || NEAT || — || align=right | 1.7 km || 
|-id=575 bgcolor=#fefefe
| 307575 ||  || — || March 31, 2003 || Kitt Peak || Spacewatch || — || align=right data-sort-value="0.87" | 870 m || 
|-id=576 bgcolor=#fefefe
| 307576 ||  || — || March 31, 2003 || Socorro || LINEAR || — || align=right | 1.1 km || 
|-id=577 bgcolor=#E9E9E9
| 307577 ||  || — || March 31, 2003 || Catalina || CSS || GER || align=right | 4.4 km || 
|-id=578 bgcolor=#d6d6d6
| 307578 ||  || — || March 24, 2003 || Kitt Peak || Spacewatch || — || align=right | 2.3 km || 
|-id=579 bgcolor=#fefefe
| 307579 ||  || — || April 2, 2003 || Socorro || LINEAR || FLO || align=right data-sort-value="0.85" | 850 m || 
|-id=580 bgcolor=#fefefe
| 307580 ||  || — || April 4, 2003 || Kitt Peak || Spacewatch || MAS || align=right data-sort-value="0.97" | 970 m || 
|-id=581 bgcolor=#d6d6d6
| 307581 ||  || — || April 8, 2003 || Kitt Peak || Spacewatch || EOS || align=right | 2.5 km || 
|-id=582 bgcolor=#d6d6d6
| 307582 ||  || — || April 7, 2003 || Kitt Peak || Spacewatch || — || align=right | 3.6 km || 
|-id=583 bgcolor=#d6d6d6
| 307583 ||  || — || April 8, 2003 || Socorro || LINEAR || — || align=right | 3.3 km || 
|-id=584 bgcolor=#fefefe
| 307584 ||  || — || April 26, 2003 || Haleakala || NEAT || V || align=right data-sort-value="0.89" | 890 m || 
|-id=585 bgcolor=#fefefe
| 307585 ||  || — || April 30, 2003 || Socorro || LINEAR || — || align=right data-sort-value="0.77" | 770 m || 
|-id=586 bgcolor=#FA8072
| 307586 ||  || — || April 28, 2003 || Socorro || LINEAR || — || align=right data-sort-value="0.92" | 920 m || 
|-id=587 bgcolor=#fefefe
| 307587 ||  || — || April 29, 2003 || Anderson Mesa || LONEOS || — || align=right data-sort-value="0.70" | 700 m || 
|-id=588 bgcolor=#d6d6d6
| 307588 ||  || — || April 24, 2003 || Haleakala || NEAT || — || align=right | 3.8 km || 
|-id=589 bgcolor=#d6d6d6
| 307589 ||  || — || April 30, 2003 || Kitt Peak || Spacewatch || EOS || align=right | 2.8 km || 
|-id=590 bgcolor=#d6d6d6
| 307590 ||  || — || May 3, 2003 || Bergisch Gladbach || W. Bickel || EOS || align=right | 2.5 km || 
|-id=591 bgcolor=#d6d6d6
| 307591 ||  || — || May 22, 2003 || Kitt Peak || Spacewatch || — || align=right | 3.9 km || 
|-id=592 bgcolor=#fefefe
| 307592 ||  || — || July 1, 2003 || Haleakala || NEAT || PHO || align=right | 1.5 km || 
|-id=593 bgcolor=#E9E9E9
| 307593 ||  || — || July 5, 2003 || Reedy Creek || J. Broughton || — || align=right | 1.5 km || 
|-id=594 bgcolor=#d6d6d6
| 307594 ||  || — || July 30, 2003 || Palomar || NEAT || — || align=right | 4.8 km || 
|-id=595 bgcolor=#fefefe
| 307595 ||  || — || July 24, 2003 || Palomar || NEAT || V || align=right data-sort-value="0.99" | 990 m || 
|-id=596 bgcolor=#fefefe
| 307596 ||  || — || July 24, 2003 || Palomar || NEAT || — || align=right | 1.7 km || 
|-id=597 bgcolor=#fefefe
| 307597 ||  || — || July 25, 2003 || Socorro || LINEAR || V || align=right data-sort-value="0.98" | 980 m || 
|-id=598 bgcolor=#E9E9E9
| 307598 ||  || — || August 1, 2003 || Socorro || LINEAR || — || align=right | 3.9 km || 
|-id=599 bgcolor=#fefefe
| 307599 ||  || — || August 20, 2003 || Campo Imperatore || CINEOS || — || align=right | 1.3 km || 
|-id=600 bgcolor=#fefefe
| 307600 ||  || — || August 20, 2003 || Črni Vrh || Črni Vrh || PHO || align=right | 1.4 km || 
|}

307601–307700 

|-bgcolor=#fefefe
| 307601 ||  || — || August 22, 2003 || Socorro || LINEAR || H || align=right data-sort-value="0.95" | 950 m || 
|-id=602 bgcolor=#fefefe
| 307602 ||  || — || August 21, 2003 || Palomar || NEAT || NYS || align=right data-sort-value="0.96" | 960 m || 
|-id=603 bgcolor=#fefefe
| 307603 ||  || — || August 22, 2003 || Palomar || NEAT || V || align=right | 1.0 km || 
|-id=604 bgcolor=#fefefe
| 307604 ||  || — || August 22, 2003 || Palomar || NEAT || — || align=right | 1.3 km || 
|-id=605 bgcolor=#fefefe
| 307605 ||  || — || August 23, 2003 || Palomar || NEAT || — || align=right | 4.1 km || 
|-id=606 bgcolor=#fefefe
| 307606 ||  || — || August 23, 2003 || Socorro || LINEAR || — || align=right | 1.3 km || 
|-id=607 bgcolor=#E9E9E9
| 307607 ||  || — || August 23, 2003 || Socorro || LINEAR || — || align=right | 1.4 km || 
|-id=608 bgcolor=#d6d6d6
| 307608 ||  || — || August 23, 2003 || Palomar || NEAT || — || align=right | 5.0 km || 
|-id=609 bgcolor=#E9E9E9
| 307609 ||  || — || August 23, 2003 || Socorro || LINEAR || IAN || align=right | 1.4 km || 
|-id=610 bgcolor=#fefefe
| 307610 ||  || — || August 25, 2003 || Palomar || NEAT || — || align=right | 1.1 km || 
|-id=611 bgcolor=#d6d6d6
| 307611 ||  || — || August 24, 2003 || Socorro || LINEAR || — || align=right | 4.6 km || 
|-id=612 bgcolor=#d6d6d6
| 307612 ||  || — || August 24, 2003 || Socorro || LINEAR || URS || align=right | 5.4 km || 
|-id=613 bgcolor=#fefefe
| 307613 ||  || — || August 27, 2003 || Needville || Needville Obs. || V || align=right data-sort-value="0.75" | 750 m || 
|-id=614 bgcolor=#fefefe
| 307614 ||  || — || August 22, 2003 || Socorro || LINEAR || MAS || align=right data-sort-value="0.82" | 820 m || 
|-id=615 bgcolor=#FA8072
| 307615 ||  || — || August 24, 2003 || Cerro Tololo || M. W. Buie || — || align=right | 1.3 km || 
|-id=616 bgcolor=#C2E0FF
| 307616 ||  || — || August 23, 2003 || Cerro Tololo || M. W. Buie || cubewano (hot) || align=right | 414 km || 
|-id=617 bgcolor=#fefefe
| 307617 ||  || — || August 31, 2003 || Socorro || LINEAR || — || align=right | 1.2 km || 
|-id=618 bgcolor=#fefefe
| 307618 ||  || — || September 14, 2003 || Haleakala || NEAT || — || align=right | 1.3 km || 
|-id=619 bgcolor=#E9E9E9
| 307619 ||  || — || September 6, 2003 || Campo Imperatore || CINEOS || — || align=right | 1.1 km || 
|-id=620 bgcolor=#fefefe
| 307620 ||  || — || September 16, 2003 || Kitt Peak || Spacewatch || — || align=right data-sort-value="0.90" | 900 m || 
|-id=621 bgcolor=#fefefe
| 307621 ||  || — || September 16, 2003 || Palomar || NEAT || CLA || align=right | 2.1 km || 
|-id=622 bgcolor=#E9E9E9
| 307622 ||  || — || September 17, 2003 || Palomar || NEAT || — || align=right | 2.6 km || 
|-id=623 bgcolor=#fefefe
| 307623 ||  || — || September 17, 2003 || Kvistaberg || UDAS || — || align=right | 1.3 km || 
|-id=624 bgcolor=#E9E9E9
| 307624 ||  || — || September 19, 2003 || Palomar || NEAT || — || align=right data-sort-value="0.86" | 860 m || 
|-id=625 bgcolor=#fefefe
| 307625 ||  || — || September 16, 2003 || Kitt Peak || Spacewatch || NYS || align=right | 1.1 km || 
|-id=626 bgcolor=#fefefe
| 307626 ||  || — || September 18, 2003 || Kleť || Kleť Obs. || — || align=right | 1.3 km || 
|-id=627 bgcolor=#fefefe
| 307627 ||  || — || September 19, 2003 || Kitt Peak || Spacewatch || — || align=right | 1.2 km || 
|-id=628 bgcolor=#fefefe
| 307628 ||  || — || September 18, 2003 || Kitt Peak || Spacewatch || MAS || align=right | 1.00 km || 
|-id=629 bgcolor=#fefefe
| 307629 ||  || — || September 19, 2003 || Haleakala || NEAT || — || align=right data-sort-value="0.98" | 980 m || 
|-id=630 bgcolor=#fefefe
| 307630 ||  || — || September 16, 2003 || Palomar || NEAT || H || align=right data-sort-value="0.73" | 730 m || 
|-id=631 bgcolor=#fefefe
| 307631 ||  || — || September 18, 2003 || Kitt Peak || Spacewatch || — || align=right | 1.2 km || 
|-id=632 bgcolor=#fefefe
| 307632 ||  || — || September 20, 2003 || Palomar || NEAT || — || align=right | 1.4 km || 
|-id=633 bgcolor=#fefefe
| 307633 ||  || — || September 20, 2003 || Palomar || NEAT || — || align=right | 1.3 km || 
|-id=634 bgcolor=#fefefe
| 307634 ||  || — || September 16, 2003 || Kitt Peak || Spacewatch || — || align=right | 1.2 km || 
|-id=635 bgcolor=#d6d6d6
| 307635 ||  || — || September 16, 2003 || Palomar || NEAT || — || align=right | 2.7 km || 
|-id=636 bgcolor=#fefefe
| 307636 ||  || — || September 16, 2003 || Anderson Mesa || LONEOS || V || align=right data-sort-value="0.92" | 920 m || 
|-id=637 bgcolor=#fefefe
| 307637 ||  || — || September 16, 2003 || Palomar || NEAT || LCI || align=right | 1.5 km || 
|-id=638 bgcolor=#d6d6d6
| 307638 ||  || — || September 17, 2003 || Kitt Peak || Spacewatch || — || align=right | 3.9 km || 
|-id=639 bgcolor=#fefefe
| 307639 ||  || — || September 17, 2003 || Socorro || LINEAR || — || align=right | 1.2 km || 
|-id=640 bgcolor=#E9E9E9
| 307640 ||  || — || September 17, 2003 || Kitt Peak || Spacewatch || HNA || align=right | 2.4 km || 
|-id=641 bgcolor=#fefefe
| 307641 ||  || — || September 20, 2003 || Socorro || LINEAR || SVE || align=right | 2.3 km || 
|-id=642 bgcolor=#d6d6d6
| 307642 ||  || — || September 20, 2003 || Palomar || NEAT || 7:4 || align=right | 6.9 km || 
|-id=643 bgcolor=#E9E9E9
| 307643 ||  || — || September 19, 2003 || Kitt Peak || Spacewatch || — || align=right data-sort-value="0.91" | 910 m || 
|-id=644 bgcolor=#E9E9E9
| 307644 ||  || — || September 16, 2003 || Socorro || LINEAR || — || align=right | 4.3 km || 
|-id=645 bgcolor=#E9E9E9
| 307645 ||  || — || September 19, 2003 || Anderson Mesa || LONEOS || — || align=right | 1.1 km || 
|-id=646 bgcolor=#fefefe
| 307646 ||  || — || September 19, 2003 || Anderson Mesa || LONEOS || NYS || align=right data-sort-value="0.88" | 880 m || 
|-id=647 bgcolor=#E9E9E9
| 307647 ||  || — || September 22, 2003 || Kitt Peak || Spacewatch || — || align=right | 2.7 km || 
|-id=648 bgcolor=#fefefe
| 307648 ||  || — || September 20, 2003 || Campo Imperatore || CINEOS || V || align=right | 1.1 km || 
|-id=649 bgcolor=#E9E9E9
| 307649 ||  || — || September 18, 2003 || Socorro || LINEAR || EUN || align=right | 1.4 km || 
|-id=650 bgcolor=#fefefe
| 307650 ||  || — || September 18, 2003 || Palomar || NEAT || MAS || align=right | 1.1 km || 
|-id=651 bgcolor=#E9E9E9
| 307651 ||  || — || September 19, 2003 || Kitt Peak || Spacewatch || — || align=right | 2.0 km || 
|-id=652 bgcolor=#fefefe
| 307652 ||  || — || September 20, 2003 || Socorro || LINEAR || V || align=right | 1.0 km || 
|-id=653 bgcolor=#E9E9E9
| 307653 ||  || — || September 22, 2003 || Anderson Mesa || LONEOS || — || align=right | 1.4 km || 
|-id=654 bgcolor=#fefefe
| 307654 ||  || — || September 20, 2003 || Palomar || NEAT || — || align=right | 1.5 km || 
|-id=655 bgcolor=#fefefe
| 307655 ||  || — || September 21, 2003 || Anderson Mesa || LONEOS || — || align=right | 1.2 km || 
|-id=656 bgcolor=#E9E9E9
| 307656 ||  || — || September 21, 2003 || Anderson Mesa || LONEOS || — || align=right | 2.0 km || 
|-id=657 bgcolor=#fefefe
| 307657 ||  || — || September 23, 2003 || Palomar || NEAT || V || align=right data-sort-value="0.97" | 970 m || 
|-id=658 bgcolor=#E9E9E9
| 307658 ||  || — || September 27, 2003 || Socorro || LINEAR || — || align=right | 4.9 km || 
|-id=659 bgcolor=#fefefe
| 307659 ||  || — || September 26, 2003 || Socorro || LINEAR || — || align=right | 1.1 km || 
|-id=660 bgcolor=#FA8072
| 307660 ||  || — || September 28, 2003 || Socorro || LINEAR || unusual || align=right | 4.0 km || 
|-id=661 bgcolor=#E9E9E9
| 307661 ||  || — || September 28, 2003 || Kitt Peak || Spacewatch || — || align=right | 1.3 km || 
|-id=662 bgcolor=#E9E9E9
| 307662 ||  || — || September 27, 2003 || Kitt Peak || Spacewatch || — || align=right | 1.3 km || 
|-id=663 bgcolor=#d6d6d6
| 307663 ||  || — || September 27, 2003 || Socorro || LINEAR || — || align=right | 4.6 km || 
|-id=664 bgcolor=#E9E9E9
| 307664 ||  || — || September 30, 2003 || Socorro || LINEAR || — || align=right | 1.1 km || 
|-id=665 bgcolor=#fefefe
| 307665 ||  || — || September 28, 2003 || Kitt Peak || Spacewatch || NYS || align=right data-sort-value="0.76" | 760 m || 
|-id=666 bgcolor=#E9E9E9
| 307666 ||  || — || September 28, 2003 || Socorro || LINEAR || — || align=right | 1.2 km || 
|-id=667 bgcolor=#fefefe
| 307667 ||  || — || September 17, 2003 || Palomar || NEAT || V || align=right | 1.00 km || 
|-id=668 bgcolor=#E9E9E9
| 307668 ||  || — || September 17, 2003 || Palomar || NEAT || EUN || align=right | 1.9 km || 
|-id=669 bgcolor=#E9E9E9
| 307669 ||  || — || September 30, 2003 || Socorro || LINEAR || — || align=right | 1.1 km || 
|-id=670 bgcolor=#E9E9E9
| 307670 ||  || — || September 26, 2003 || Socorro || LINEAR || — || align=right | 2.1 km || 
|-id=671 bgcolor=#E9E9E9
| 307671 ||  || — || September 17, 2003 || Palomar || NEAT || — || align=right | 1.2 km || 
|-id=672 bgcolor=#FA8072
| 307672 ||  || — || September 22, 2003 || Palomar || NEAT || H || align=right data-sort-value="0.83" | 830 m || 
|-id=673 bgcolor=#fefefe
| 307673 ||  || — || September 17, 2003 || Kitt Peak || Spacewatch || V || align=right data-sort-value="0.73" | 730 m || 
|-id=674 bgcolor=#fefefe
| 307674 ||  || — || September 17, 2003 || Kitt Peak || Spacewatch || — || align=right data-sort-value="0.94" | 940 m || 
|-id=675 bgcolor=#fefefe
| 307675 ||  || — || September 19, 2003 || Kitt Peak || Spacewatch || — || align=right data-sort-value="0.94" | 940 m || 
|-id=676 bgcolor=#E9E9E9
| 307676 ||  || — || September 27, 2003 || Kitt Peak || Spacewatch || — || align=right data-sort-value="0.82" | 820 m || 
|-id=677 bgcolor=#E9E9E9
| 307677 ||  || — || September 30, 2003 || Kitt Peak || Spacewatch || — || align=right | 1.2 km || 
|-id=678 bgcolor=#fefefe
| 307678 ||  || — || September 26, 2003 || Apache Point || SDSS || NYS || align=right data-sort-value="0.76" | 760 m || 
|-id=679 bgcolor=#fefefe
| 307679 ||  || — || September 20, 2003 || Campo Imperatore || CINEOS || V || align=right data-sort-value="0.83" | 830 m || 
|-id=680 bgcolor=#fefefe
| 307680 ||  || — || September 25, 2003 || Palomar || NEAT || — || align=right data-sort-value="0.91" | 910 m || 
|-id=681 bgcolor=#fefefe
| 307681 ||  || — || September 25, 2003 || Mauna Kea || P. A. Wiegert || MAS || align=right data-sort-value="0.74" | 740 m || 
|-id=682 bgcolor=#E9E9E9
| 307682 ||  || — || October 4, 2003 || Kingsnake || J. V. McClusky || — || align=right | 1.3 km || 
|-id=683 bgcolor=#fefefe
| 307683 ||  || — || October 1, 2003 || Anderson Mesa || LONEOS || H || align=right data-sort-value="0.93" | 930 m || 
|-id=684 bgcolor=#fefefe
| 307684 ||  || — || October 14, 2003 || Anderson Mesa || LONEOS || — || align=right | 1.1 km || 
|-id=685 bgcolor=#fefefe
| 307685 ||  || — || October 3, 2003 || Kitt Peak || Spacewatch || — || align=right | 1.3 km || 
|-id=686 bgcolor=#E9E9E9
| 307686 ||  || — || October 16, 2003 || Kitt Peak || Spacewatch || — || align=right | 1.1 km || 
|-id=687 bgcolor=#fefefe
| 307687 ||  || — || October 18, 2003 || Palomar || NEAT || H || align=right data-sort-value="0.74" | 740 m || 
|-id=688 bgcolor=#E9E9E9
| 307688 ||  || — || October 18, 2003 || Kleť || Kleť Obs. || — || align=right data-sort-value="0.87" | 870 m || 
|-id=689 bgcolor=#fefefe
| 307689 ||  || — || October 19, 2003 || Kitt Peak || Spacewatch || H || align=right data-sort-value="0.49" | 490 m || 
|-id=690 bgcolor=#fefefe
| 307690 ||  || — || October 20, 2003 || Kitt Peak || Spacewatch || ERI || align=right | 1.6 km || 
|-id=691 bgcolor=#fefefe
| 307691 ||  || — || October 16, 2003 || Anderson Mesa || LONEOS || — || align=right | 1.1 km || 
|-id=692 bgcolor=#E9E9E9
| 307692 ||  || — || October 16, 2003 || Kitt Peak || Spacewatch || — || align=right | 1.5 km || 
|-id=693 bgcolor=#E9E9E9
| 307693 ||  || — || October 20, 2003 || Kingsnake || J. V. McClusky || — || align=right | 1.1 km || 
|-id=694 bgcolor=#d6d6d6
| 307694 ||  || — || October 19, 2003 || Kitt Peak || Spacewatch || — || align=right | 2.9 km || 
|-id=695 bgcolor=#E9E9E9
| 307695 ||  || — || October 23, 2003 || Kvistaberg || UDAS || — || align=right | 1.3 km || 
|-id=696 bgcolor=#d6d6d6
| 307696 ||  || — || October 17, 2003 || Kitt Peak || Spacewatch || — || align=right | 4.7 km || 
|-id=697 bgcolor=#E9E9E9
| 307697 ||  || — || October 16, 2003 || Kitt Peak || Spacewatch || — || align=right | 1.0 km || 
|-id=698 bgcolor=#fefefe
| 307698 ||  || — || October 18, 2003 || Kitt Peak || Spacewatch || — || align=right | 1.2 km || 
|-id=699 bgcolor=#fefefe
| 307699 ||  || — || October 18, 2003 || Palomar || NEAT || H || align=right data-sort-value="0.96" | 960 m || 
|-id=700 bgcolor=#fefefe
| 307700 ||  || — || October 16, 2003 || Palomar || NEAT || — || align=right | 1.6 km || 
|}

307701–307800 

|-bgcolor=#E9E9E9
| 307701 ||  || — || October 18, 2003 || Kitt Peak || Spacewatch || — || align=right | 1.1 km || 
|-id=702 bgcolor=#E9E9E9
| 307702 ||  || — || October 19, 2003 || Kitt Peak || Spacewatch || — || align=right | 1.4 km || 
|-id=703 bgcolor=#d6d6d6
| 307703 ||  || — || October 16, 2003 || Palomar || NEAT || HIL3:2 || align=right | 6.4 km || 
|-id=704 bgcolor=#fefefe
| 307704 ||  || — || October 17, 2003 || Anderson Mesa || LONEOS || H || align=right data-sort-value="0.79" | 790 m || 
|-id=705 bgcolor=#d6d6d6
| 307705 ||  || — || October 18, 2003 || Kitt Peak || Spacewatch || EUP || align=right | 5.7 km || 
|-id=706 bgcolor=#E9E9E9
| 307706 ||  || — || October 16, 2003 || Anderson Mesa || LONEOS || — || align=right | 1.3 km || 
|-id=707 bgcolor=#E9E9E9
| 307707 ||  || — || October 18, 2003 || Palomar || NEAT || — || align=right | 1.6 km || 
|-id=708 bgcolor=#E9E9E9
| 307708 ||  || — || October 20, 2003 || Palomar || NEAT || — || align=right | 1.5 km || 
|-id=709 bgcolor=#E9E9E9
| 307709 ||  || — || October 20, 2003 || Palomar || NEAT || — || align=right | 1.5 km || 
|-id=710 bgcolor=#fefefe
| 307710 ||  || — || October 17, 2003 || Anderson Mesa || LONEOS || — || align=right | 1.3 km || 
|-id=711 bgcolor=#fefefe
| 307711 ||  || — || October 18, 2003 || Kitt Peak || Spacewatch || MAS || align=right | 1.0 km || 
|-id=712 bgcolor=#E9E9E9
| 307712 ||  || — || October 19, 2003 || Kitt Peak || Spacewatch || — || align=right data-sort-value="0.98" | 980 m || 
|-id=713 bgcolor=#E9E9E9
| 307713 ||  || — || October 18, 2003 || Palomar || NEAT || GER || align=right | 1.4 km || 
|-id=714 bgcolor=#fefefe
| 307714 ||  || — || October 18, 2003 || Anderson Mesa || LONEOS || V || align=right | 1.1 km || 
|-id=715 bgcolor=#d6d6d6
| 307715 ||  || — || October 18, 2003 || Anderson Mesa || LONEOS || EOS || align=right | 4.1 km || 
|-id=716 bgcolor=#E9E9E9
| 307716 ||  || — || October 18, 2003 || Anderson Mesa || LONEOS || — || align=right | 1.7 km || 
|-id=717 bgcolor=#E9E9E9
| 307717 ||  || — || October 19, 2003 || Anderson Mesa || LONEOS || — || align=right | 1.3 km || 
|-id=718 bgcolor=#fefefe
| 307718 ||  || — || October 21, 2003 || Kitt Peak || Spacewatch || — || align=right | 1.3 km || 
|-id=719 bgcolor=#E9E9E9
| 307719 ||  || — || October 21, 2003 || Kitt Peak || Spacewatch || — || align=right | 1.7 km || 
|-id=720 bgcolor=#fefefe
| 307720 ||  || — || October 20, 2003 || Kitt Peak || Spacewatch || — || align=right | 1.3 km || 
|-id=721 bgcolor=#E9E9E9
| 307721 ||  || — || October 22, 2003 || Socorro || LINEAR || — || align=right | 1.5 km || 
|-id=722 bgcolor=#d6d6d6
| 307722 ||  || — || October 22, 2003 || Socorro || LINEAR || — || align=right | 5.2 km || 
|-id=723 bgcolor=#E9E9E9
| 307723 ||  || — || October 19, 2003 || Kitt Peak || Spacewatch || — || align=right | 1.2 km || 
|-id=724 bgcolor=#E9E9E9
| 307724 ||  || — || October 19, 2003 || Kitt Peak || Spacewatch || MAR || align=right | 1.2 km || 
|-id=725 bgcolor=#fefefe
| 307725 ||  || — || October 20, 2003 || Socorro || LINEAR || — || align=right | 1.4 km || 
|-id=726 bgcolor=#E9E9E9
| 307726 ||  || — || October 21, 2003 || Anderson Mesa || LONEOS || — || align=right | 1.00 km || 
|-id=727 bgcolor=#E9E9E9
| 307727 ||  || — || October 21, 2003 || Socorro || LINEAR || — || align=right | 1.1 km || 
|-id=728 bgcolor=#E9E9E9
| 307728 ||  || — || October 23, 2003 || Anderson Mesa || LONEOS || — || align=right | 1.0 km || 
|-id=729 bgcolor=#E9E9E9
| 307729 ||  || — || October 20, 2003 || Kitt Peak || Spacewatch || — || align=right | 1.0 km || 
|-id=730 bgcolor=#E9E9E9
| 307730 ||  || — || October 20, 2003 || Kitt Peak || Spacewatch || — || align=right | 1.6 km || 
|-id=731 bgcolor=#E9E9E9
| 307731 ||  || — || October 21, 2003 || Kitt Peak || Spacewatch || — || align=right data-sort-value="0.78" | 780 m || 
|-id=732 bgcolor=#E9E9E9
| 307732 ||  || — || October 21, 2003 || Kitt Peak || Spacewatch || — || align=right | 1.1 km || 
|-id=733 bgcolor=#E9E9E9
| 307733 ||  || — || October 21, 2003 || Socorro || LINEAR || MAR || align=right | 1.1 km || 
|-id=734 bgcolor=#E9E9E9
| 307734 ||  || — || October 21, 2003 || Socorro || LINEAR || — || align=right | 1.1 km || 
|-id=735 bgcolor=#fefefe
| 307735 ||  || — || October 21, 2003 || Socorro || LINEAR || — || align=right data-sort-value="0.89" | 890 m || 
|-id=736 bgcolor=#E9E9E9
| 307736 ||  || — || October 23, 2003 || Kitt Peak || Spacewatch || — || align=right | 1.3 km || 
|-id=737 bgcolor=#E9E9E9
| 307737 ||  || — || October 23, 2003 || Anderson Mesa || LONEOS || — || align=right | 1.6 km || 
|-id=738 bgcolor=#E9E9E9
| 307738 ||  || — || October 23, 2003 || Anderson Mesa || LONEOS || — || align=right data-sort-value="0.93" | 930 m || 
|-id=739 bgcolor=#d6d6d6
| 307739 ||  || — || October 24, 2003 || Socorro || LINEAR || HYG || align=right | 3.6 km || 
|-id=740 bgcolor=#E9E9E9
| 307740 ||  || — || October 24, 2003 || Socorro || LINEAR || — || align=right | 1.7 km || 
|-id=741 bgcolor=#d6d6d6
| 307741 ||  || — || October 24, 2003 || Socorro || LINEAR || — || align=right | 4.9 km || 
|-id=742 bgcolor=#E9E9E9
| 307742 ||  || — || October 25, 2003 || Socorro || LINEAR || — || align=right | 1.7 km || 
|-id=743 bgcolor=#E9E9E9
| 307743 ||  || — || October 27, 2003 || Socorro || LINEAR || — || align=right | 1.2 km || 
|-id=744 bgcolor=#d6d6d6
| 307744 ||  || — || October 28, 2003 || Socorro || LINEAR || SHU3:2 || align=right | 5.8 km || 
|-id=745 bgcolor=#fefefe
| 307745 ||  || — || October 17, 2003 || Palomar || NEAT || — || align=right | 2.2 km || 
|-id=746 bgcolor=#fefefe
| 307746 ||  || — || October 25, 2003 || Socorro || LINEAR || NYS || align=right | 1.0 km || 
|-id=747 bgcolor=#fefefe
| 307747 ||  || — || October 27, 2003 || Socorro || LINEAR || — || align=right | 1.4 km || 
|-id=748 bgcolor=#E9E9E9
| 307748 ||  || — || October 27, 2003 || Socorro || LINEAR || DOR || align=right | 4.0 km || 
|-id=749 bgcolor=#fefefe
| 307749 ||  || — || October 19, 2003 || Kitt Peak || Spacewatch || — || align=right | 1.1 km || 
|-id=750 bgcolor=#fefefe
| 307750 ||  || — || October 29, 2003 || Anderson Mesa || LONEOS || NYS || align=right data-sort-value="0.94" | 940 m || 
|-id=751 bgcolor=#fefefe
| 307751 ||  || — || October 16, 2003 || Kitt Peak || Spacewatch || — || align=right data-sort-value="0.84" | 840 m || 
|-id=752 bgcolor=#E9E9E9
| 307752 ||  || — || October 18, 2003 || Apache Point || SDSS || — || align=right data-sort-value="0.76" | 760 m || 
|-id=753 bgcolor=#fefefe
| 307753 ||  || — || October 18, 2003 || Apache Point || SDSS || MAS || align=right data-sort-value="0.69" | 690 m || 
|-id=754 bgcolor=#fefefe
| 307754 ||  || — || October 18, 2003 || Apache Point || SDSS || NYS || align=right data-sort-value="0.93" | 930 m || 
|-id=755 bgcolor=#d6d6d6
| 307755 ||  || — || September 20, 2003 || Campo Imperatore || CINEOS || SHU3:2 || align=right | 4.3 km || 
|-id=756 bgcolor=#E9E9E9
| 307756 ||  || — || October 19, 2003 || Kitt Peak || Spacewatch || — || align=right | 1.2 km || 
|-id=757 bgcolor=#fefefe
| 307757 ||  || — || October 22, 2003 || Apache Point || SDSS || — || align=right | 1.1 km || 
|-id=758 bgcolor=#E9E9E9
| 307758 ||  || — || October 22, 2003 || Kitt Peak || M. W. Buie || — || align=right | 1.3 km || 
|-id=759 bgcolor=#fefefe
| 307759 ||  || — || October 23, 2003 || Apache Point || SDSS || — || align=right data-sort-value="0.86" | 860 m || 
|-id=760 bgcolor=#fefefe
| 307760 ||  || — || October 23, 2003 || Apache Point || SDSS || — || align=right data-sort-value="0.81" | 810 m || 
|-id=761 bgcolor=#E9E9E9
| 307761 || 2003 VF || — || November 3, 2003 || Piszkéstető || K. Sárneczky, S. Mészáros || — || align=right | 1.6 km || 
|-id=762 bgcolor=#E9E9E9
| 307762 ||  || — || November 5, 2003 || Socorro || LINEAR || — || align=right | 4.8 km || 
|-id=763 bgcolor=#E9E9E9
| 307763 ||  || — || November 15, 2003 || Kitt Peak || Spacewatch || — || align=right | 1.7 km || 
|-id=764 bgcolor=#fefefe
| 307764 ||  || — || November 15, 2003 || Palomar || NEAT || H || align=right data-sort-value="0.80" | 800 m || 
|-id=765 bgcolor=#E9E9E9
| 307765 ||  || — || November 15, 2003 || Palomar || NEAT || — || align=right | 1.8 km || 
|-id=766 bgcolor=#E9E9E9
| 307766 ||  || — || November 4, 2003 || Socorro || LINEAR || — || align=right | 1.6 km || 
|-id=767 bgcolor=#E9E9E9
| 307767 ||  || — || November 16, 2003 || Kitt Peak || Spacewatch || — || align=right | 1.4 km || 
|-id=768 bgcolor=#E9E9E9
| 307768 ||  || — || November 18, 2003 || Kitt Peak || Spacewatch || — || align=right | 1.2 km || 
|-id=769 bgcolor=#fefefe
| 307769 ||  || — || November 18, 2003 || Kitt Peak || Spacewatch || — || align=right | 1.4 km || 
|-id=770 bgcolor=#E9E9E9
| 307770 ||  || — || November 19, 2003 || Kitt Peak || Spacewatch || — || align=right | 1.3 km || 
|-id=771 bgcolor=#d6d6d6
| 307771 ||  || — || November 23, 2003 || Catalina || CSS || Tj (2.9) || align=right | 9.1 km || 
|-id=772 bgcolor=#E9E9E9
| 307772 ||  || — || November 18, 2003 || Palomar || NEAT || — || align=right data-sort-value="0.79" | 790 m || 
|-id=773 bgcolor=#fefefe
| 307773 ||  || — || November 19, 2003 || Kitt Peak || Spacewatch || NYS || align=right data-sort-value="0.61" | 610 m || 
|-id=774 bgcolor=#d6d6d6
| 307774 ||  || — || November 20, 2003 || Socorro || LINEAR || SHU3:2 || align=right | 7.9 km || 
|-id=775 bgcolor=#E9E9E9
| 307775 ||  || — || November 20, 2003 || Socorro || LINEAR || — || align=right | 1.7 km || 
|-id=776 bgcolor=#E9E9E9
| 307776 ||  || — || November 20, 2003 || Socorro || LINEAR || — || align=right | 1.1 km || 
|-id=777 bgcolor=#E9E9E9
| 307777 ||  || — || November 18, 2003 || Kitt Peak || Spacewatch || — || align=right | 1.4 km || 
|-id=778 bgcolor=#fefefe
| 307778 ||  || — || November 19, 2003 || Kitt Peak || Spacewatch || NYS || align=right data-sort-value="0.99" | 990 m || 
|-id=779 bgcolor=#E9E9E9
| 307779 ||  || — || November 19, 2003 || Kitt Peak || Spacewatch || — || align=right | 1.6 km || 
|-id=780 bgcolor=#E9E9E9
| 307780 ||  || — || November 20, 2003 || Socorro || LINEAR || — || align=right | 1.0 km || 
|-id=781 bgcolor=#d6d6d6
| 307781 ||  || — || November 18, 2003 || Palomar || NEAT || Tj (2.92) || align=right | 4.2 km || 
|-id=782 bgcolor=#fefefe
| 307782 ||  || — || November 21, 2003 || Kitt Peak || Spacewatch || — || align=right | 1.4 km || 
|-id=783 bgcolor=#d6d6d6
| 307783 ||  || — || November 21, 2003 || Socorro || LINEAR || — || align=right | 5.9 km || 
|-id=784 bgcolor=#E9E9E9
| 307784 ||  || — || November 19, 2003 || Anderson Mesa || LONEOS || BAR || align=right | 2.1 km || 
|-id=785 bgcolor=#E9E9E9
| 307785 ||  || — || November 20, 2003 || Socorro || LINEAR || — || align=right | 1.1 km || 
|-id=786 bgcolor=#d6d6d6
| 307786 ||  || — || November 21, 2003 || Palomar || NEAT || — || align=right | 4.1 km || 
|-id=787 bgcolor=#E9E9E9
| 307787 ||  || — || November 21, 2003 || Socorro || LINEAR || — || align=right | 1.0 km || 
|-id=788 bgcolor=#E9E9E9
| 307788 ||  || — || November 21, 2003 || Socorro || LINEAR || — || align=right | 1.1 km || 
|-id=789 bgcolor=#E9E9E9
| 307789 ||  || — || November 23, 2003 || Socorro || LINEAR || — || align=right | 2.0 km || 
|-id=790 bgcolor=#E9E9E9
| 307790 ||  || — || November 20, 2003 || Socorro || LINEAR || — || align=right data-sort-value="0.90" | 900 m || 
|-id=791 bgcolor=#E9E9E9
| 307791 ||  || — || November 20, 2003 || Socorro || LINEAR || EUN || align=right | 1.7 km || 
|-id=792 bgcolor=#d6d6d6
| 307792 ||  || — || November 20, 2003 || Socorro || LINEAR || 3:2 || align=right | 3.7 km || 
|-id=793 bgcolor=#E9E9E9
| 307793 ||  || — || November 20, 2003 || Socorro || LINEAR || — || align=right | 2.5 km || 
|-id=794 bgcolor=#E9E9E9
| 307794 ||  || — || November 20, 2003 || Socorro || LINEAR || — || align=right | 1.6 km || 
|-id=795 bgcolor=#E9E9E9
| 307795 ||  || — || November 20, 2003 || Socorro || LINEAR || — || align=right | 3.0 km || 
|-id=796 bgcolor=#E9E9E9
| 307796 ||  || — || November 20, 2003 || Socorro || LINEAR || — || align=right | 1.6 km || 
|-id=797 bgcolor=#E9E9E9
| 307797 ||  || — || November 20, 2003 || Socorro || LINEAR || — || align=right | 1.2 km || 
|-id=798 bgcolor=#E9E9E9
| 307798 ||  || — || November 20, 2003 || Socorro || LINEAR || HNS || align=right | 1.9 km || 
|-id=799 bgcolor=#E9E9E9
| 307799 ||  || — || November 20, 2003 || Socorro || LINEAR || — || align=right | 1.2 km || 
|-id=800 bgcolor=#fefefe
| 307800 ||  || — || November 20, 2003 || Socorro || LINEAR || H || align=right | 1.6 km || 
|}

307801–307900 

|-bgcolor=#E9E9E9
| 307801 ||  || — || November 21, 2003 || Palomar || NEAT || — || align=right | 1.6 km || 
|-id=802 bgcolor=#E9E9E9
| 307802 ||  || — || November 21, 2003 || Socorro || LINEAR || — || align=right | 1.2 km || 
|-id=803 bgcolor=#E9E9E9
| 307803 ||  || — || November 21, 2003 || Socorro || LINEAR || — || align=right | 1.4 km || 
|-id=804 bgcolor=#fefefe
| 307804 ||  || — || November 21, 2003 || Socorro || LINEAR || H || align=right data-sort-value="0.80" | 800 m || 
|-id=805 bgcolor=#E9E9E9
| 307805 ||  || — || November 21, 2003 || Palomar || NEAT || — || align=right | 2.4 km || 
|-id=806 bgcolor=#E9E9E9
| 307806 ||  || — || November 23, 2003 || Palomar || NEAT || MAR || align=right | 1.4 km || 
|-id=807 bgcolor=#fefefe
| 307807 ||  || — || November 23, 2003 || Socorro || LINEAR || FLO || align=right data-sort-value="0.66" | 660 m || 
|-id=808 bgcolor=#E9E9E9
| 307808 ||  || — || November 24, 2003 || Anderson Mesa || LONEOS || — || align=right | 1.2 km || 
|-id=809 bgcolor=#fefefe
| 307809 ||  || — || November 30, 2003 || Socorro || LINEAR || H || align=right | 1.1 km || 
|-id=810 bgcolor=#E9E9E9
| 307810 ||  || — || November 23, 2003 || Anderson Mesa || LONEOS || MAR || align=right | 1.4 km || 
|-id=811 bgcolor=#E9E9E9
| 307811 ||  || — || November 29, 2003 || Socorro || LINEAR || — || align=right | 2.4 km || 
|-id=812 bgcolor=#E9E9E9
| 307812 ||  || — || November 21, 2003 || Kitt Peak || M. W. Buie || — || align=right data-sort-value="0.71" | 710 m || 
|-id=813 bgcolor=#E9E9E9
| 307813 ||  || — || November 19, 2003 || Palomar || NEAT || — || align=right | 1.3 km || 
|-id=814 bgcolor=#fefefe
| 307814 ||  || — || November 16, 2003 || Apache Point || SDSS || — || align=right data-sort-value="0.86" | 860 m || 
|-id=815 bgcolor=#E9E9E9
| 307815 ||  || — || November 19, 2003 || Kitt Peak || Spacewatch || — || align=right data-sort-value="0.82" | 820 m || 
|-id=816 bgcolor=#fefefe
| 307816 ||  || — || November 16, 2003 || Apache Point || SDSS || H || align=right data-sort-value="0.62" | 620 m || 
|-id=817 bgcolor=#E9E9E9
| 307817 ||  || — || December 1, 2003 || Socorro || LINEAR || — || align=right | 1.3 km || 
|-id=818 bgcolor=#fefefe
| 307818 ||  || — || December 15, 2003 || Socorro || LINEAR || H || align=right | 1.3 km || 
|-id=819 bgcolor=#E9E9E9
| 307819 ||  || — || December 15, 2003 || Socorro || LINEAR || — || align=right | 2.7 km || 
|-id=820 bgcolor=#fefefe
| 307820 ||  || — || December 14, 2003 || Kitt Peak || Spacewatch || H || align=right data-sort-value="0.86" | 860 m || 
|-id=821 bgcolor=#fefefe
| 307821 ||  || — || December 3, 2003 || Socorro || LINEAR || — || align=right | 1.2 km || 
|-id=822 bgcolor=#E9E9E9
| 307822 ||  || — || December 4, 2003 || Socorro || LINEAR || — || align=right | 1.3 km || 
|-id=823 bgcolor=#E9E9E9
| 307823 ||  || — || December 16, 2003 || Kitt Peak || Spacewatch || — || align=right | 1.5 km || 
|-id=824 bgcolor=#E9E9E9
| 307824 ||  || — || December 16, 2003 || Catalina || CSS || — || align=right | 1.1 km || 
|-id=825 bgcolor=#E9E9E9
| 307825 ||  || — || December 17, 2003 || Socorro || LINEAR || — || align=right | 2.5 km || 
|-id=826 bgcolor=#E9E9E9
| 307826 ||  || — || December 17, 2003 || Socorro || LINEAR || — || align=right | 1.0 km || 
|-id=827 bgcolor=#E9E9E9
| 307827 ||  || — || December 16, 2003 || Anderson Mesa || LONEOS || — || align=right | 2.0 km || 
|-id=828 bgcolor=#fefefe
| 307828 ||  || — || December 18, 2003 || Socorro || LINEAR || FLO || align=right data-sort-value="0.86" | 860 m || 
|-id=829 bgcolor=#fefefe
| 307829 ||  || — || December 18, 2003 || Socorro || LINEAR || H || align=right data-sort-value="0.96" | 960 m || 
|-id=830 bgcolor=#E9E9E9
| 307830 ||  || — || December 19, 2003 || Kitt Peak || Spacewatch || — || align=right | 1.6 km || 
|-id=831 bgcolor=#E9E9E9
| 307831 ||  || — || December 19, 2003 || Kitt Peak || Spacewatch || — || align=right | 1.1 km || 
|-id=832 bgcolor=#E9E9E9
| 307832 ||  || — || December 17, 2003 || Socorro || LINEAR || — || align=right | 1.3 km || 
|-id=833 bgcolor=#E9E9E9
| 307833 ||  || — || December 18, 2003 || Socorro || LINEAR || — || align=right | 1.2 km || 
|-id=834 bgcolor=#fefefe
| 307834 ||  || — || December 19, 2003 || Palomar || NEAT || H || align=right data-sort-value="0.73" | 730 m || 
|-id=835 bgcolor=#E9E9E9
| 307835 ||  || — || December 19, 2003 || Kitt Peak || Spacewatch || — || align=right | 2.9 km || 
|-id=836 bgcolor=#E9E9E9
| 307836 ||  || — || December 20, 2003 || Socorro || LINEAR || — || align=right | 1.5 km || 
|-id=837 bgcolor=#E9E9E9
| 307837 ||  || — || December 18, 2003 || Socorro || LINEAR || — || align=right | 1.5 km || 
|-id=838 bgcolor=#E9E9E9
| 307838 ||  || — || December 19, 2003 || Socorro || LINEAR || — || align=right | 1.4 km || 
|-id=839 bgcolor=#E9E9E9
| 307839 ||  || — || December 20, 2003 || Socorro || LINEAR || — || align=right | 1.8 km || 
|-id=840 bgcolor=#d6d6d6
| 307840 ||  || — || December 21, 2003 || Socorro || LINEAR || Tj (2.98) || align=right | 7.9 km || 
|-id=841 bgcolor=#E9E9E9
| 307841 ||  || — || December 22, 2003 || Socorro || LINEAR || BRG || align=right | 2.2 km || 
|-id=842 bgcolor=#E9E9E9
| 307842 ||  || — || December 22, 2003 || Kitt Peak || Spacewatch || — || align=right | 1.5 km || 
|-id=843 bgcolor=#E9E9E9
| 307843 ||  || — || December 23, 2003 || Socorro || LINEAR || — || align=right | 1.3 km || 
|-id=844 bgcolor=#fefefe
| 307844 ||  || — || December 27, 2003 || Socorro || LINEAR || H || align=right data-sort-value="0.76" | 760 m || 
|-id=845 bgcolor=#E9E9E9
| 307845 ||  || — || December 27, 2003 || Socorro || LINEAR || — || align=right | 1.8 km || 
|-id=846 bgcolor=#E9E9E9
| 307846 ||  || — || December 27, 2003 || Socorro || LINEAR || RAF || align=right | 1.7 km || 
|-id=847 bgcolor=#E9E9E9
| 307847 ||  || — || December 28, 2003 || Socorro || LINEAR || — || align=right | 1.9 km || 
|-id=848 bgcolor=#E9E9E9
| 307848 ||  || — || December 28, 2003 || Socorro || LINEAR || — || align=right | 2.0 km || 
|-id=849 bgcolor=#E9E9E9
| 307849 ||  || — || December 28, 2003 || Socorro || LINEAR || — || align=right | 1.8 km || 
|-id=850 bgcolor=#E9E9E9
| 307850 ||  || — || December 28, 2003 || Socorro || LINEAR || — || align=right | 1.6 km || 
|-id=851 bgcolor=#E9E9E9
| 307851 ||  || — || December 28, 2003 || Socorro || LINEAR || — || align=right | 1.3 km || 
|-id=852 bgcolor=#E9E9E9
| 307852 ||  || — || December 29, 2003 || Socorro || LINEAR || — || align=right | 2.0 km || 
|-id=853 bgcolor=#E9E9E9
| 307853 ||  || — || December 29, 2003 || Socorro || LINEAR || — || align=right | 1.5 km || 
|-id=854 bgcolor=#E9E9E9
| 307854 ||  || — || December 17, 2003 || Socorro || LINEAR || — || align=right | 1.7 km || 
|-id=855 bgcolor=#E9E9E9
| 307855 ||  || — || December 17, 2003 || Palomar || NEAT || — || align=right | 1.5 km || 
|-id=856 bgcolor=#E9E9E9
| 307856 ||  || — || January 13, 2004 || Anderson Mesa || LONEOS || — || align=right | 1.5 km || 
|-id=857 bgcolor=#fefefe
| 307857 ||  || — || January 14, 2004 || Palomar || NEAT || H || align=right | 1.0 km || 
|-id=858 bgcolor=#E9E9E9
| 307858 ||  || — || January 14, 2004 || Palomar || NEAT || — || align=right | 2.1 km || 
|-id=859 bgcolor=#E9E9E9
| 307859 ||  || — || January 14, 2004 || Palomar || NEAT || — || align=right | 1.7 km || 
|-id=860 bgcolor=#E9E9E9
| 307860 ||  || — || January 15, 2004 || Kitt Peak || Spacewatch || — || align=right | 1.6 km || 
|-id=861 bgcolor=#E9E9E9
| 307861 ||  || — || January 14, 2004 || Palomar || NEAT || EUN || align=right | 1.8 km || 
|-id=862 bgcolor=#fefefe
| 307862 ||  || — || January 16, 2004 || Palomar || NEAT || NYS || align=right data-sort-value="0.78" | 780 m || 
|-id=863 bgcolor=#E9E9E9
| 307863 ||  || — || January 16, 2004 || Palomar || NEAT || — || align=right | 1.7 km || 
|-id=864 bgcolor=#E9E9E9
| 307864 ||  || — || January 17, 2004 || Palomar || NEAT || — || align=right | 1.3 km || 
|-id=865 bgcolor=#E9E9E9
| 307865 ||  || — || January 18, 2004 || Catalina || CSS || — || align=right | 1.7 km || 
|-id=866 bgcolor=#E9E9E9
| 307866 ||  || — || January 18, 2004 || Palomar || NEAT || — || align=right | 1.8 km || 
|-id=867 bgcolor=#fefefe
| 307867 ||  || — || January 19, 2004 || Socorro || LINEAR || H || align=right | 1.1 km || 
|-id=868 bgcolor=#E9E9E9
| 307868 ||  || — || January 19, 2004 || Kitt Peak || Spacewatch || — || align=right | 1.2 km || 
|-id=869 bgcolor=#E9E9E9
| 307869 ||  || — || January 19, 2004 || Socorro || LINEAR || — || align=right | 2.0 km || 
|-id=870 bgcolor=#E9E9E9
| 307870 ||  || — || January 19, 2004 || Kitt Peak || Spacewatch || — || align=right | 1.6 km || 
|-id=871 bgcolor=#fefefe
| 307871 ||  || — || January 21, 2004 || Socorro || LINEAR || — || align=right | 1.2 km || 
|-id=872 bgcolor=#E9E9E9
| 307872 ||  || — || January 18, 2004 || Palomar || NEAT || — || align=right | 2.4 km || 
|-id=873 bgcolor=#E9E9E9
| 307873 ||  || — || January 22, 2004 || Socorro || LINEAR || — || align=right data-sort-value="0.85" | 850 m || 
|-id=874 bgcolor=#E9E9E9
| 307874 ||  || — || January 23, 2004 || Socorro || LINEAR || — || align=right | 2.0 km || 
|-id=875 bgcolor=#E9E9E9
| 307875 ||  || — || January 21, 2004 || Socorro || LINEAR || — || align=right | 2.7 km || 
|-id=876 bgcolor=#E9E9E9
| 307876 ||  || — || January 22, 2004 || Socorro || LINEAR || — || align=right | 1.7 km || 
|-id=877 bgcolor=#FA8072
| 307877 ||  || — || January 26, 2004 || Kingsnake || J. V. McClusky || — || align=right | 3.4 km || 
|-id=878 bgcolor=#E9E9E9
| 307878 ||  || — || January 23, 2004 || Socorro || LINEAR || JUN || align=right | 1.7 km || 
|-id=879 bgcolor=#E9E9E9
| 307879 ||  || — || January 24, 2004 || Socorro || LINEAR || — || align=right | 1.2 km || 
|-id=880 bgcolor=#E9E9E9
| 307880 ||  || — || January 25, 2004 || Haleakala || NEAT || — || align=right | 1.9 km || 
|-id=881 bgcolor=#E9E9E9
| 307881 ||  || — || January 22, 2004 || Palomar || NEAT || — || align=right | 1.7 km || 
|-id=882 bgcolor=#E9E9E9
| 307882 ||  || — || January 28, 2004 || Socorro || LINEAR || BAR || align=right | 1.5 km || 
|-id=883 bgcolor=#E9E9E9
| 307883 ||  || — || January 28, 2004 || Catalina || CSS || JUN || align=right | 1.4 km || 
|-id=884 bgcolor=#E9E9E9
| 307884 ||  || — || January 28, 2004 || Kitt Peak || Spacewatch || — || align=right | 1.9 km || 
|-id=885 bgcolor=#E9E9E9
| 307885 ||  || — || January 24, 2004 || Socorro || LINEAR || — || align=right | 1.6 km || 
|-id=886 bgcolor=#E9E9E9
| 307886 ||  || — || January 30, 2004 || Catalina || CSS || — || align=right | 2.5 km || 
|-id=887 bgcolor=#E9E9E9
| 307887 ||  || — || January 21, 2004 || Socorro || LINEAR || — || align=right | 2.2 km || 
|-id=888 bgcolor=#E9E9E9
| 307888 ||  || — || January 18, 2004 || Palomar || NEAT || — || align=right | 1.4 km || 
|-id=889 bgcolor=#E9E9E9
| 307889 ||  || — || January 23, 2004 || Socorro || LINEAR || — || align=right | 1.4 km || 
|-id=890 bgcolor=#E9E9E9
| 307890 ||  || — || January 28, 2004 || Apache Point || SDSS || — || align=right | 2.1 km || 
|-id=891 bgcolor=#E9E9E9
| 307891 ||  || — || February 11, 2004 || Palomar || NEAT || EUN || align=right | 1.8 km || 
|-id=892 bgcolor=#E9E9E9
| 307892 ||  || — || February 10, 2004 || Catalina || CSS || — || align=right | 1.3 km || 
|-id=893 bgcolor=#E9E9E9
| 307893 ||  || — || February 11, 2004 || Kitt Peak || Spacewatch || — || align=right | 1.5 km || 
|-id=894 bgcolor=#E9E9E9
| 307894 ||  || — || February 10, 2004 || Palomar || NEAT || — || align=right | 2.5 km || 
|-id=895 bgcolor=#E9E9E9
| 307895 ||  || — || February 12, 2004 || Palomar || NEAT || — || align=right | 3.1 km || 
|-id=896 bgcolor=#E9E9E9
| 307896 ||  || — || February 12, 2004 || Kitt Peak || Spacewatch || — || align=right | 1.5 km || 
|-id=897 bgcolor=#E9E9E9
| 307897 ||  || — || February 11, 2004 || Catalina || CSS || — || align=right | 2.2 km || 
|-id=898 bgcolor=#E9E9E9
| 307898 ||  || — || February 12, 2004 || Palomar || NEAT || — || align=right | 3.5 km || 
|-id=899 bgcolor=#E9E9E9
| 307899 ||  || — || February 12, 2004 || Kitt Peak || Spacewatch || — || align=right | 2.2 km || 
|-id=900 bgcolor=#E9E9E9
| 307900 ||  || — || February 10, 2004 || Palomar || NEAT || — || align=right | 1.2 km || 
|}

307901–308000 

|-bgcolor=#E9E9E9
| 307901 ||  || — || February 11, 2004 || Kitt Peak || Spacewatch || — || align=right | 1.2 km || 
|-id=902 bgcolor=#fefefe
| 307902 ||  || — || February 12, 2004 || Palomar || NEAT || V || align=right data-sort-value="0.95" | 950 m || 
|-id=903 bgcolor=#E9E9E9
| 307903 ||  || — || February 10, 2004 || Palomar || NEAT || — || align=right | 1.4 km || 
|-id=904 bgcolor=#E9E9E9
| 307904 ||  || — || February 11, 2004 || Kitt Peak || Spacewatch || — || align=right | 1.1 km || 
|-id=905 bgcolor=#E9E9E9
| 307905 ||  || — || February 11, 2004 || Kitt Peak || Spacewatch || — || align=right | 1.6 km || 
|-id=906 bgcolor=#E9E9E9
| 307906 ||  || — || February 13, 2004 || Kitt Peak || Spacewatch || — || align=right | 3.1 km || 
|-id=907 bgcolor=#fefefe
| 307907 ||  || — || February 11, 2004 || Palomar || NEAT || — || align=right | 1.4 km || 
|-id=908 bgcolor=#E9E9E9
| 307908 ||  || — || February 11, 2004 || Kitt Peak || Spacewatch || — || align=right | 2.0 km || 
|-id=909 bgcolor=#E9E9E9
| 307909 ||  || — || February 14, 2004 || Palomar || NEAT || — || align=right | 3.5 km || 
|-id=910 bgcolor=#E9E9E9
| 307910 ||  || — || February 15, 2004 || Catalina || CSS || — || align=right | 4.2 km || 
|-id=911 bgcolor=#E9E9E9
| 307911 ||  || — || February 12, 2004 || Kitt Peak || Spacewatch || WIT || align=right | 1.0 km || 
|-id=912 bgcolor=#E9E9E9
| 307912 ||  || — || February 18, 2004 || Socorro || LINEAR || — || align=right | 2.6 km || 
|-id=913 bgcolor=#E9E9E9
| 307913 ||  || — || February 17, 2004 || Catalina || CSS || ADE || align=right | 2.4 km || 
|-id=914 bgcolor=#d6d6d6
| 307914 ||  || — || February 17, 2004 || Catalina || CSS || — || align=right | 2.8 km || 
|-id=915 bgcolor=#E9E9E9
| 307915 ||  || — || February 17, 2004 || Kitt Peak || Spacewatch || — || align=right | 1.5 km || 
|-id=916 bgcolor=#E9E9E9
| 307916 ||  || — || February 23, 2004 || Bergisch Gladbac || W. Bickel || MRX || align=right | 1.1 km || 
|-id=917 bgcolor=#E9E9E9
| 307917 ||  || — || March 12, 2004 || Palomar || NEAT || — || align=right | 2.7 km || 
|-id=918 bgcolor=#FFC2E0
| 307918 ||  || — || March 15, 2004 || Socorro || LINEAR || ATEcritical || align=right data-sort-value="0.37" | 370 m || 
|-id=919 bgcolor=#fefefe
| 307919 ||  || — || March 15, 2004 || Catalina || CSS || — || align=right | 1.0 km || 
|-id=920 bgcolor=#E9E9E9
| 307920 ||  || — || March 14, 2004 || Kitt Peak || Spacewatch || — || align=right | 1.6 km || 
|-id=921 bgcolor=#E9E9E9
| 307921 ||  || — || March 13, 2004 || Palomar || NEAT || MRX || align=right | 1.3 km || 
|-id=922 bgcolor=#d6d6d6
| 307922 ||  || — || March 15, 2004 || Kitt Peak || Spacewatch || KOR || align=right | 1.2 km || 
|-id=923 bgcolor=#E9E9E9
| 307923 ||  || — || March 15, 2004 || Kitt Peak || Spacewatch || — || align=right | 1.2 km || 
|-id=924 bgcolor=#fefefe
| 307924 ||  || — || March 15, 2004 || Catalina || CSS || H || align=right data-sort-value="0.87" | 870 m || 
|-id=925 bgcolor=#E9E9E9
| 307925 ||  || — || March 13, 2004 || Palomar || NEAT || ADE || align=right | 2.4 km || 
|-id=926 bgcolor=#E9E9E9
| 307926 ||  || — || March 13, 2004 || Palomar || NEAT || 526 || align=right | 3.5 km || 
|-id=927 bgcolor=#E9E9E9
| 307927 ||  || — || March 14, 2004 || Palomar || NEAT || — || align=right | 1.6 km || 
|-id=928 bgcolor=#E9E9E9
| 307928 ||  || — || March 14, 2004 || Palomar || NEAT || — || align=right | 2.3 km || 
|-id=929 bgcolor=#E9E9E9
| 307929 ||  || — || March 15, 2004 || Catalina || CSS || — || align=right | 3.6 km || 
|-id=930 bgcolor=#E9E9E9
| 307930 ||  || — || March 15, 2004 || Catalina || CSS || — || align=right | 2.2 km || 
|-id=931 bgcolor=#E9E9E9
| 307931 ||  || — || March 15, 2004 || Socorro || LINEAR || — || align=right | 1.9 km || 
|-id=932 bgcolor=#E9E9E9
| 307932 ||  || — || March 15, 2004 || Palomar || NEAT || — || align=right | 2.2 km || 
|-id=933 bgcolor=#E9E9E9
| 307933 ||  || — || March 14, 2004 || Socorro || LINEAR || — || align=right | 3.3 km || 
|-id=934 bgcolor=#E9E9E9
| 307934 ||  || — || March 14, 2004 || Socorro || LINEAR || — || align=right | 1.5 km || 
|-id=935 bgcolor=#E9E9E9
| 307935 ||  || — || March 14, 2004 || Socorro || LINEAR || — || align=right | 2.9 km || 
|-id=936 bgcolor=#E9E9E9
| 307936 ||  || — || March 15, 2004 || Socorro || LINEAR || — || align=right | 2.4 km || 
|-id=937 bgcolor=#E9E9E9
| 307937 ||  || — || March 13, 2004 || Palomar || NEAT || — || align=right | 1.6 km || 
|-id=938 bgcolor=#E9E9E9
| 307938 ||  || — || March 14, 2004 || Palomar || NEAT || — || align=right | 2.8 km || 
|-id=939 bgcolor=#E9E9E9
| 307939 ||  || — || March 15, 2004 || Catalina || CSS || — || align=right | 2.2 km || 
|-id=940 bgcolor=#E9E9E9
| 307940 ||  || — || March 15, 2004 || Socorro || LINEAR || — || align=right | 1.1 km || 
|-id=941 bgcolor=#E9E9E9
| 307941 ||  || — || March 16, 2004 || Kitt Peak || Spacewatch || — || align=right | 1.6 km || 
|-id=942 bgcolor=#fefefe
| 307942 ||  || — || March 28, 2004 || Socorro || LINEAR || H || align=right data-sort-value="0.71" | 710 m || 
|-id=943 bgcolor=#E9E9E9
| 307943 ||  || — || March 19, 2004 || Socorro || LINEAR || — || align=right | 2.1 km || 
|-id=944 bgcolor=#E9E9E9
| 307944 ||  || — || March 19, 2004 || Kitt Peak || Spacewatch || HEN || align=right | 1.1 km || 
|-id=945 bgcolor=#E9E9E9
| 307945 ||  || — || March 19, 2004 || Palomar || NEAT || — || align=right | 1.6 km || 
|-id=946 bgcolor=#E9E9E9
| 307946 ||  || — || March 20, 2004 || Socorro || LINEAR || — || align=right | 1.4 km || 
|-id=947 bgcolor=#E9E9E9
| 307947 ||  || — || March 27, 2004 || Anderson Mesa || LONEOS || — || align=right | 2.7 km || 
|-id=948 bgcolor=#d6d6d6
| 307948 ||  || — || March 29, 2004 || Kitt Peak || Spacewatch || — || align=right | 2.6 km || 
|-id=949 bgcolor=#E9E9E9
| 307949 ||  || — || March 18, 2004 || Socorro || LINEAR || — || align=right | 2.6 km || 
|-id=950 bgcolor=#E9E9E9
| 307950 ||  || — || March 27, 2004 || Socorro || LINEAR || — || align=right | 2.1 km || 
|-id=951 bgcolor=#E9E9E9
| 307951 ||  || — || March 27, 2004 || Socorro || LINEAR || — || align=right | 2.7 km || 
|-id=952 bgcolor=#E9E9E9
| 307952 ||  || — || February 17, 2004 || Catalina || CSS || — || align=right | 2.1 km || 
|-id=953 bgcolor=#E9E9E9
| 307953 ||  || — || April 11, 2004 || Palomar || NEAT || JUN || align=right | 4.2 km || 
|-id=954 bgcolor=#d6d6d6
| 307954 ||  || — || April 12, 2004 || Kitt Peak || Spacewatch || — || align=right | 2.8 km || 
|-id=955 bgcolor=#fefefe
| 307955 ||  || — || April 12, 2004 || Kitt Peak || Spacewatch || — || align=right data-sort-value="0.95" | 950 m || 
|-id=956 bgcolor=#E9E9E9
| 307956 ||  || — || April 15, 2004 || Palomar || NEAT || EUN || align=right | 1.4 km || 
|-id=957 bgcolor=#d6d6d6
| 307957 ||  || — || April 12, 2004 || Kitt Peak || Spacewatch || — || align=right | 1.9 km || 
|-id=958 bgcolor=#E9E9E9
| 307958 ||  || — || April 14, 2004 || Kitt Peak || Spacewatch || — || align=right | 1.1 km || 
|-id=959 bgcolor=#fefefe
| 307959 ||  || — || April 15, 2004 || Anderson Mesa || LONEOS || V || align=right data-sort-value="0.83" | 830 m || 
|-id=960 bgcolor=#d6d6d6
| 307960 ||  || — || April 15, 2004 || Siding Spring || SSS || — || align=right | 4.5 km || 
|-id=961 bgcolor=#E9E9E9
| 307961 ||  || — || April 16, 2004 || Socorro || LINEAR || — || align=right | 2.7 km || 
|-id=962 bgcolor=#E9E9E9
| 307962 ||  || — || April 21, 2004 || Kitt Peak || Spacewatch || XIZ || align=right | 1.4 km || 
|-id=963 bgcolor=#E9E9E9
| 307963 ||  || — || April 24, 2004 || Catalina || CSS || JUN || align=right | 1.8 km || 
|-id=964 bgcolor=#E9E9E9
| 307964 ||  || — || April 25, 2004 || Socorro || LINEAR || — || align=right | 2.3 km || 
|-id=965 bgcolor=#E9E9E9
| 307965 ||  || — || April 17, 2004 || Socorro || LINEAR || — || align=right | 2.9 km || 
|-id=966 bgcolor=#E9E9E9
| 307966 ||  || — || May 9, 2004 || Palomar || NEAT || CLO || align=right | 2.6 km || 
|-id=967 bgcolor=#fefefe
| 307967 ||  || — || May 13, 2004 || Socorro || LINEAR || H || align=right data-sort-value="0.81" | 810 m || 
|-id=968 bgcolor=#E9E9E9
| 307968 ||  || — || May 11, 2004 || Anderson Mesa || LONEOS || — || align=right | 1.4 km || 
|-id=969 bgcolor=#E9E9E9
| 307969 ||  || — || May 13, 2004 || Kitt Peak || Spacewatch || MRX || align=right | 1.6 km || 
|-id=970 bgcolor=#fefefe
| 307970 ||  || — || May 14, 2004 || Socorro || LINEAR || PHO || align=right | 1.6 km || 
|-id=971 bgcolor=#FA8072
| 307971 ||  || — || June 11, 2004 || Socorro || LINEAR || — || align=right | 4.4 km || 
|-id=972 bgcolor=#d6d6d6
| 307972 ||  || — || June 12, 2004 || Socorro || LINEAR || — || align=right | 3.1 km || 
|-id=973 bgcolor=#E9E9E9
| 307973 ||  || — || July 14, 2004 || Socorro || LINEAR || JUN || align=right | 1.4 km || 
|-id=974 bgcolor=#fefefe
| 307974 ||  || — || July 11, 2004 || Socorro || LINEAR || — || align=right data-sort-value="0.64" | 640 m || 
|-id=975 bgcolor=#fefefe
| 307975 ||  || — || August 7, 2004 || Palomar || NEAT || — || align=right data-sort-value="0.89" | 890 m || 
|-id=976 bgcolor=#fefefe
| 307976 ||  || — || August 6, 2004 || Palomar || NEAT || — || align=right data-sort-value="0.85" | 850 m || 
|-id=977 bgcolor=#fefefe
| 307977 ||  || — || August 8, 2004 || Socorro || LINEAR || — || align=right data-sort-value="0.98" | 980 m || 
|-id=978 bgcolor=#fefefe
| 307978 ||  || — || August 8, 2004 || Socorro || LINEAR || V || align=right data-sort-value="0.98" | 980 m || 
|-id=979 bgcolor=#fefefe
| 307979 ||  || — || August 8, 2004 || Socorro || LINEAR || — || align=right data-sort-value="0.95" | 950 m || 
|-id=980 bgcolor=#E9E9E9
| 307980 ||  || — || August 10, 2004 || Socorro || LINEAR || — || align=right | 1.0 km || 
|-id=981 bgcolor=#E9E9E9
| 307981 ||  || — || August 9, 2004 || Socorro || LINEAR || MAR || align=right | 1.4 km || 
|-id=982 bgcolor=#C2E0FF
| 307982 ||  || — || August 4, 2004 || Palomar || Palomar Obs. || SDO || align=right | 449 km || 
|-id=983 bgcolor=#fefefe
| 307983 ||  || — || August 21, 2004 || Catalina || CSS || — || align=right data-sort-value="0.73" | 730 m || 
|-id=984 bgcolor=#FA8072
| 307984 ||  || — || August 20, 2004 || Socorro || LINEAR || — || align=right | 1.7 km || 
|-id=985 bgcolor=#fefefe
| 307985 ||  || — || August 25, 2004 || Kitt Peak || Spacewatch || FLO || align=right data-sort-value="0.65" | 650 m || 
|-id=986 bgcolor=#FA8072
| 307986 ||  || — || August 26, 2004 || Socorro || LINEAR || — || align=right | 1.7 km || 
|-id=987 bgcolor=#fefefe
| 307987 ||  || — || August 26, 2004 || Siding Spring || SSS || — || align=right data-sort-value="0.77" | 770 m || 
|-id=988 bgcolor=#fefefe
| 307988 ||  || — || September 4, 2004 || Palomar || NEAT || — || align=right | 1.4 km || 
|-id=989 bgcolor=#d6d6d6
| 307989 ||  || — || September 6, 2004 || Socorro || LINEAR || ALA || align=right | 6.5 km || 
|-id=990 bgcolor=#E9E9E9
| 307990 ||  || — || September 3, 2004 || Anderson Mesa || LONEOS || — || align=right | 1.9 km || 
|-id=991 bgcolor=#E9E9E9
| 307991 ||  || — || September 4, 2004 || Palomar || NEAT || — || align=right | 3.9 km || 
|-id=992 bgcolor=#E9E9E9
| 307992 ||  || — || September 7, 2004 || Socorro || LINEAR || — || align=right | 1.7 km || 
|-id=993 bgcolor=#fefefe
| 307993 ||  || — || September 8, 2004 || Socorro || LINEAR || — || align=right data-sort-value="0.79" | 790 m || 
|-id=994 bgcolor=#fefefe
| 307994 ||  || — || September 8, 2004 || Socorro || LINEAR || — || align=right data-sort-value="0.94" | 940 m || 
|-id=995 bgcolor=#fefefe
| 307995 ||  || — || September 8, 2004 || Socorro || LINEAR || — || align=right | 1.0 km || 
|-id=996 bgcolor=#fefefe
| 307996 ||  || — || September 8, 2004 || Socorro || LINEAR || — || align=right data-sort-value="0.80" | 800 m || 
|-id=997 bgcolor=#fefefe
| 307997 ||  || — || September 8, 2004 || Socorro || LINEAR || FLO || align=right data-sort-value="0.90" | 900 m || 
|-id=998 bgcolor=#fefefe
| 307998 ||  || — || September 8, 2004 || Socorro || LINEAR || — || align=right | 1.3 km || 
|-id=999 bgcolor=#fefefe
| 307999 ||  || — || September 8, 2004 || Socorro || LINEAR || FLO || align=right data-sort-value="0.72" | 720 m || 
|-id=000 bgcolor=#fefefe
| 308000 ||  || — || September 8, 2004 || Socorro || LINEAR || — || align=right data-sort-value="0.89" | 890 m || 
|}

References

External links 
 Discovery Circumstances: Numbered Minor Planets (305001)–(310000) (IAU Minor Planet Center)

0307